= 1995 World Championships in Athletics – Men's 5000 metres =

These are the official results of the Men's 5,000 metres event at the 1995 World Championships in Gothenburg, Sweden. There were a total number of 48 participating athletes, with three qualifying heats and the final held on Sunday 1995-08-13.

== Final ==
RANK	FINAL	TIME
	Ismael Kirui (KEN)	13:16.77
	Khalid Boulami (MAR)	13:17.15
	Shem Kororia (KEN)	13:17.59
4.	Ismaïl Sghyr (MAR)	13:17.86
5.	Brahim Lahlafi (MAR)	13:18.89
6.	Worku Bikila (ETH)	13:20.12
7.	Bob Kennedy (USA)	13:32.10
8.	Fita Bayisa (ETH)	13:34.52
9.	Dieter Baumann (GER)	13:39.98
10.	Phillimon Hanneck (ZIM)	13:41.28
11.	Gennaro Di Napoli (ITA)	13:46.51
12.	Mark Carroll (IRL)	13:46.80
13.	Anacleto Jiménez (ESP)	13:48.53
14.	John Nuttall (GBR)	13:49.25
15.	Abdellah Béhar (FRA)	14:19.04

== Qualifying heats ==
- Held on Friday 1995-08-11

RANK	HEAT 1	TIME
1.	Dieter Baumann (GER)	13:30.59
2.	Brahim Lahlafi (MAR)	13:31.21
3.	Phillimon Hanneck (ZIM)	13:31.93
4.	Worku Bikila (ETH)	13:32.47
5.	Enrique Molina (ESP)	13:32.87
6.	Rob Denmark (GBR)	13:37.14
7.	Simon Chemoiywo (KEN)	13:39.04
8.	Reda Benzine (ALG)	13:45.39
9.	Hamid Sadjadi (IRI)	13:53.40
10.	Jan Pesava (CZE)	13:53.86
11.	Panagiotis Papoulias (GRE)	14:00.93
12.	Atiq Naaji (FRA)	14:06.28
13.	Bahadur Prasad (IND)	14:09.51
14.	Jim Spivey (USA)	14:25.39
15.	Mahmoud-Hasini Sreiss (JOR)	14:38.15
–	Paulo Guerra (POR)	DNS

RANK	HEAT 2	TIME
1.	Gennaro Di Napoli (ITA)	13:23.87
2.	Khalid Boulami (MAR)	13:24.05
3.	Mark Carroll (IRL)	13:24.19
4.	Ismael Kirui (KEN)	13:24.30
5.	Anacleto Jiménez (ESP)	13:24.83
6.	John Nuttall (GBR)	13:25.18
7.	Abdellah Béhar (FRA)	13:26.70
8.	Róbert Štefko (SVK)	13:30.70
9.	Mark Coogan (USA)	13:36.86
10.	Aurelio Handanga (ANG)	13:40.12 (NR)
11.	Vener Kashayev (RUS)	13:45.35
12.	Silvio Guerra (ECU)	13:45.81
–	Abdelkareem Moti (PLE)	DNF
–	José Ramos (POR)	DNF
–	Haile Gebrselassie (ETH)	DNS
–	Charles Mulinga (ZAM)	DNS

RANK	HEAT 3	TIME
1.	Ismaïl Sghyr (MAR)	13:24.56
2.	Fita Bayisa (ETH)	13:25.19
3.	Shem Kororia (KEN)	13:25.27
4.	Bob Kennedy (USA)	13:26.72
5.	Shaun Creighton (AUS)	13:29.43
6.	Manuel Pancorbo (ESP)	13:33.74
7.	Ricardo Herrera (MEX)	13:35.90
8.	Cormac Finnerty (IRL)	13:36.01
9.	Mohamed Ezzher (FRA)	13:37.05
10.	Yahia Azaidj (ALG)	13:47.63
11.	Ruddy Walem (BEL)	13:59.87
12.	Adrian Passey (GBR)	14:08.06
13.	Sipho Dlamini (SWZ)	14:34.99
14.	Ali Awad (LIB)	14:46.80
15.	Said Gomez (PAN)	15:07.13
–	Alyan Sultan Al-Qahtani (KSA)	DNS

== See also ==
- 1993 Men's World Championships 5,000 metres (Stuttgart)
- 1994 Men's European Championships 5,000 metres (Helsinki)
- 1996 Men's Olympic 5,000 metres (Atlanta)
- 1997 Men's World Championships 5,000 metres (Athens)
- 1998 Men's European Championships 5,000 metres (Budapest)
