= 1998 IAAF World Cross Country Championships – Senior men's race =

Senior men's race at the 1998 IAAF World Cross Country Championships
- Organisers: IAAF
- Edition: 26th
- Date: March 22
- Host city: Marrakesh, Morocco
- Venue: Menara district
- Events: 1
- Distances: 12 km – Senior men
- Participation: 181 athletes from 46 nations

The Senior men's race at the 1998 IAAF World Cross Country Championships was held in Marrakesh, Morocco, at the Menara district on March 22, 1998. Reports on the event were given in The New York Times, in the Herald, and for the IAAF.

Complete results for individuals, for teams, medallists, and the results of British athletes were published.

== Race results ==
=== Senior men's race (12 km) ===
==== Individual ====
Rank	Athlete	Country	Time
1st place, gold medalist(s)	Paul Tergat	Kenya	34:01
2nd place, silver medalist(s)	Paul Koech	Kenya	34:06
3rd place, bronze medalist(s)	Assefa Mezegebu	Ethiopia	34:28
4	Tom Nyariki	Kenya	34:37
5	Wilson Boit Kipketer	Kenya	34:38
6	Christopher Kelong	Kenya	34:41
7	Ismael Kirui	Kenya	34:41
8	Mohammed Mourhit	Belgium	34:44
9	Domingos Castro	Portugal	34:46
10	Fabián Roncero	Spain	34:50
11	Elarbi Khattabi	Morocco	34:54
12	Paulo Guerra	Portugal	34:59
13	Habte Jifar	Ethiopia	35:08
14	Lahcen Benyoussef	Morocco	35:11
15	Wilbroad Axweso	Tanzania	35:15
16	Bob Kennedy	United States	35:18
17	Brahim Lahlafi	Morocco	35:20
18	Khaled Boulami	Morocco	35:21
19	Patrick Ndayisenga	Burundi	35:23
20	Tesfaye Tola	Ethiopia	35:24
21	Ayele Mezegebu	Ethiopia	35:29
22	Shaun Creighton	Australia	35:33
23	Bruno Toledo	Spain	35:34
24	Abraham Assefa	Ethiopia	35:35
25	Eduardo Henriques	Portugal	35:36
26	Benedict Ako	Tanzania	35:37
27	Adam Goucher	United States	35:39
28	José Regalo	Portugal	35:40
29	José Manuel García	Spain	35:43
30	Hideaki Haraguchi	Japan	35:47
31	Reinholdt Iita	Namibia	35:54
32	Alejandro Gómez	Spain	35:57
33	Toshinari Takaoka	Japan	35:58
34	Kamiel Maase	Netherlands	36:00
35	Tarek Zoghmar	Algeria	36:04
36	Hendrick Ramaala	South Africa	36:06
37	Rachid Berradi	Italy	36:14
38	Glynn Tromans	United Kingdom	36:19
39	Alberto Maravilha	Portugal	36:19
40	Cormac Finnerty	Ireland	36:20
41	Tadeo Nada	Tanzania	36:23
42	Francesco Bennici	Italy	36:23
43	Sérgio da Silva	Brazil	36:24
44	Keith Cullen	United Kingdom	36:25
45	Seamus Power	Ireland	36:26
46	Réda Benzine	Algeria	36:26
47	Enoch Skosana	South Africa	36:27
48	Samir Moussaoui	Algeria	36:28
49	Kabo Gabaseme	Botswana	36:31
50	Driss El Himer	France	36:32
51	Kudakwashe Shoko	Zimbabwe	36:32
52	Carlos Peña	Mexico	36:35
53	Abdelilah El Manaia	Morocco	36:35
54	Simone Zanon	Italy	36:36
55	Elijah Mutandiro	Zimbabwe	36:37
56	Jacinto Navarrete	Colombia	36:38
57	Krzysztof Baldyga	Poland	36:38
58	Abdellah Béhar	France	36:39
59	Andrew Pearson	United Kingdom	36:41
60	Lee Troop	Australia	36:46
61	Godfrey Koki	Zimbabwe	36:47
62	Tim Hacker	United States	36:48
63	Julio Rey	Spain	36:49
64	Azzedine Sakhri	Algeria	36:49
65	Tomohiro Seto	Japan	36:50
66	Alejandro Cuahtepizi	Mexico	36:52
67	Diego Colorado	Colombia	36:55
68	Chris Weber	Canada	36:58
69	Dragoslav Prpa	Yugoslavia	37:00
70	Daniel Ferreira	Brazil	37:00
71	Michele Gamba	Italy	37:01
72	Billy Ntlogelang	Botswana	37:02
73	Janko Bensa	Yugoslavia	37:03
74	Faustin Saktay	Tanzania	37:04
75	John Nuttall	United Kingdom	37:06
76	Hendrick Khumalo	South Africa	37:07
77	Viktor Röthlin	Switzerland	37:09
78	Mohamed Driouche	Algeria	37:13
79	Lahbib Hanini	France	37:16
80	Martin Lauret	Netherlands	37:18
81	Elias Bastos	Brazil	37:19
82	Ville Hautala	Finland	37:20
83	Ahmed Abd El Mangoud	Egypt	37:21
84	Dmitriy Maksimov	Russia	37:24
85	Pavel Loskutov	Estonia	37:25
86	Santtu Mäkinen	Finland	37:25
87	Chris Robison	United Kingdom	37:26
88	Gabriele De Nard	Italy	37:26
89	Pete Julian	United States	37:30
90	Julian Dwyer	Australia	37:35
91	Mamo Kejela	Ethiopia	37:35
92	Ayman Mahmoud	Egypt	37:39
93	Mikaël Thomas	France	37:42
94	David Evans	Australia	37:44
95	Seiji Kushibe	Japan	37:46
96	René Godlieb	Netherlands	37:47
97	Ali El-Zaidi	Libya	37:48
98	Semyon Zhustin	Russia	37:49
99	Jussi Utriainen	Finland	37:50
100	Eric Quiros	Costa Rica	37:53
101	Toomas Tarm	Estonia	37:54
102	Imre Berkovics	Hungary	37:58
103	Jose Duarte	Mexico	38:01
104	Cian McLoughlin	Ireland	38:02
105	Marcel Versteeg	Netherlands	38:03
106	Colin de Burca	Ireland	38:04
107	Joseph Tjitunga	Namibia	38:10
108	Kim Gillard	Australia	38:14
109	Juan Jaranillo	Colombia	38:14
110	Martín Pitayo	Mexico	38:16
111	Spencer Duval	United Kingdom	38:16
112	Lesedinyana Lekgoa	Botswana	38:23
113	Alphonse Munyeshyaka	Rwanda	38:28
114	Menon Ramsamy	Mauritius	38:32
115	Julián Berrio	Colombia	38:33
116	Pacifique Ayabusa	Rwanda	38:37
117	Yan Orlandi	Switzerland	38:39
118	Abd Al-Rasool Ahmed	Egypt	38:42
119	Jussi Virtanen	Finland	38:43
120	James Finlayson	Canada	38:45
121	Glody Dube	Botswana	38:50
122	Ernest Ndjissipou	Central African Republic	38:52
123	Heiki Sarapuu	Estonia	38:54
124	Paddy McCluskey	Canada	38:56
125	Toni Bernadó	Andorra	38:56
126	Soro Bassirima	Côte d'Ivoire	39:02
127	Wael Anwar	Egypt	39:03
128	Robert Gary	United States	39:04
129	Pauric McKinney	Ireland	39:14
130	Robert Smits	Netherlands	39:15
131	Graham Cocksedge	Canada	39:21
132	Tiyapo Maso	Botswana	39:22
133	Fouly Salem	Egypt	39:28
134	Farag Abdelnaby	Egypt	39:36
135	Meelis Veilberg	Estonia	39:38
136	Dieudonné Disi	Rwanda	39:45
137	Joseph Nsengiyumya	Rwanda	39:46
138	Bruno Le Stum	France	39:55
139	Margus Pirksaar	Estonia	40:00
140	Mothusi Pelaelo	Botswana	40:13
141	Jumaine Hakizimaha	Rwanda	40:22
142	Rachid Safari	Rwanda	40:23
143	Tiburce Mboumba	Gabon	40:26
144	Tsunake Kalamori	South Africa	40:33
145	Charygeldiy Allaberdiyev	Turkmenistan	40:34
146	Parakhat Kurtgeldiyev	Turkmenistan	40:34
147	Abdullah Fergani	Libya	40:46
148	Leonard Madinda	Gabon	41:15
149	Mahamed Kouerh	Libya	41:24
150	Basile Lendoye	Gabon	41:24
151	Konan Severin N'dri	Côte d'Ivoire	41:51
152	Younes Yousef	Libya	42:04
153	Loasis Boussougou	Gabon	42:17
154	David Kanie	Papua New Guinea	42:25
155	Sergey Zabavskiy	Tajikistan	43:04
156	Souleymane Bamba	Côte d'Ivoire	43:06
157	Guy Schultz	Canada	43:10
158	Gervais Yapo Yapi	Côte d'Ivoire	43:34
159	Alphonse Miuoubi	Gabon	43:41
160	Hugues Kombila	Gabon	43:46
161	Lee Kar-Lun	Hong Kong	43:52
162	Gumsie Taulobi	Papua New Guinea	44:22
163	Ken Mova	Papua New Guinea	45:05
—	Alfredo Bráz	Portugal	DNF
—	Enrique Molina	Spain	DNF
—	Pablo Olmedo	Mexico	DNF
—	Andrew Panga	Tanzania	DNF
—	Smail Sghir	Morocco	DNF
—	Kamel Kohil	Algeria	DNF
—	Benoît Zwierzchiewski	France	DNF
—	Abel Chimukoko	Zimbabwe	DNF
—	Hayk Khojumyan	Armenia	DNF
—	Trent Harlow	Australia	DNF
—	Sergio Couto	Brazil	DNF
—	David Rueben	Papua New Guinea	DNF
—	Robert Cook Jr.	United States	DNF
—	Michael Ngaaseke	Zimbabwe	DNF
—	Shingirai Badza	Zimbabwe	DNF
—	Ian Forsythe	Canada	DNF
—	Gustav Hendricks	Namibia	DNF
—	Baimurad Achirmuradov	Turkmenistan	DNF

==== Teams ====
Rank	Team	Points
1st place, gold medalist(s)	Kenya: Paul Tergat / 1; Paul Koech / 2; Tom Nyariki / 4; Wilson Boit Kipketer / 5; (Christopher Kelong) / (6); (Ismael Kirui) / (7)	12
2nd place, silver medalist(s)	Ethiopia: Assefa Mezegebu / 3; Habte Jifar / 13; Tesfaye Tola / 20; Ayele Mezegebu / 21; (Abraham Assefa) / (24); (Mamo Kejela) / (91)	57
3rd place, bronze medalist(s)	Morocco: Elarbi Khattabi / 11; Lahcen Benyoussef / 14; Brahim Lahlafi / 17; Khaled Boulami / 18; (Abdelilah El Manaia) / (53); (Smail Sghir) / (DNF)	60
4	Portugal: Domingos Castro / 9; Paulo Guerra / 12; Eduardo Henriques / 25; José Regalo / 28; (Alberto Maravilha) / (39); (Alfredo Bráz) / (DNF)	74
5	Spain: Fabián Roncero / 10; Bruno Toledo / 23; José Manuel García / 29; Alejandro Gómez / 32; (Julio Rey) / (63); (Enrique Molina) / (DNF)	94
6	Tanzania: Wilbroad Axweso / 15; Benedict Ako / 26; Tadeo Nada / 41; Faustin Saktay / 74; (Andrew Panga) / (DNF)	156
7	Algeria: Tarek Zoghmar / 35; Réda Benzine / 46; Samir Moussaoui / 48; Azzedine Sakhri / 64; (Mohamed Driouche) / (78); (Kamel Kohil) / (DNF)	193
8	United States: Bob Kennedy / 16; Adam Goucher / 27; Tim Hacker / 62; Pete Julian / 89; (Robert Gary) / (128); (Robert Cook Jr.) / (DNF)	194
9	Italy: Rachid Berradi / 37; Francesco Bennici / 42; Simone Zanon / 54; Michele Gamba / 71; (Gabriele De Nard) / (88)	204
10	United Kingdom: Glynn Tromans / 38; Keith Cullen / 44; Andrew Pearson / 59; John Nuttall / 75; (Chris Robison) / (87); (Spencer Duval) / (111)	216
11	Japan: Hideaki Haraguchi / 30; Toshinari Takaoka / 33; Tomohiro Seto / 65; Seiji Kushibe / 95	223
12	Australia: Shaun Creighton / 22; Lee Troop / 60; Julian Dwyer / 90; David Evans / 94; (Kim Gillard) / (108); (Trent Harlow) / (DNF)	266
13	France: Driss El Himer / 50; Abdellah Béhar / 58; Lahbib Hanini / 79; Mikaël Thomas / 93; (Bruno Le Stum) / (138); (Benoît Zwierzchiewski) / (DNF)	280
14	Ireland: Cormac Finnerty / 40; Seamus Power / 45; Cian McLoughlin / 104; Colin de Burca / 106; (Pauric McKinney) / (129)	295
15	South Africa: Hendrick Ramaala / 36; Enoch Skosana / 47; Hendrick Khumalo / 76; Tsunake Kalamori / 144	303
16	Netherlands: Kamiel Maase / 34; Martin Lauret / 80; René Godlieb / 96; Marcel Versteeg / 105; (Robert Smits) / (130)	315
17	Mexico: Carlos Peña / 52; Alejandro Cuahtepizi / 66; Jose Duarte / 103; Martín Pitayo / 110; (Pablo Olmedo) / (DNF)	331
18	Colombia: Jacinto Navarrete / 56; Diego Colorado / 67; Juan Jaranillo / 109; Julián Berrio / 115	347
19	Botswana: Kabo Gabaseme / 49; Billy Ntlogelang / 72; Lesedinyana Lekgoa / 112; Glody Dube / 121; (Tiyapo Maso) / (132); (Mothusi Pelaelo) / (140)	354
20	Finland: Ville Hautala / 82; Santtu Mäkinen / 86; Jussi Utriainen / 99; Jussi Virtanen / 119	386
21	Egypt: Ahmed Abd El Mangoud / 83; Ayman Mahmoud / 92; Abd Al-Rasool Ahmed / 118; Wael Anwar / 127; (Fouly Salem) / (133); (Farag Abdelnaby) / (134)	420
22	Canada: Chris Weber / 68; James Finlayson / 120; Paddy McCluskey / 124; Graham Cocksedge / 131; (Guy Schultz) / (157); (Ian Forsythe) / (DNF)	443
23	Estonia: Pavel Loskutov / 85; Toomas Tarm / 101; Heiki Sarapuu / 123; Meelis Veilberg / 135; (Margus Pirksaar) / (139)	444
24	Rwanda: Alphonse Munyeshyaka / 113; Pacifique Ayabusa / 116; Dieudonné Disi / 136; Joseph Nsengiyumya / 137; (Jumaine Hakizimaha) / (141); (Rachid Safari) / (142)	502
25	Libya: Ali El-Zaidi / 97; Abdullah Fergani / 147; Mahamed Kouerh / 149; Younes Yousef / 152	545
26	Côte d'Ivoire: Soro Bassirima / 126; Konan Severin N'dri / 151; Souleymane Bamba / 156; Gervais Yapo Yapi / 158	591
27	Gabon: Tiburce Mboumba / 143; Leonard Madinda / 148; Basile Lendoye / 150; Loasis Boussougou / 153; (Alphonse Miuoubi) / (159); (Hugues Kombila) / (160)	594
DNF	Zimbabwe: (Kudakwashe Shoko) / (51); (Elijah Mutandiro) / (55); (Godfrey Koki) / (61); (Abel Chimukoko) / (DNF); (Michael Ngaaseke) / (DNF); (Shingirai Badza) / (DNF)	DNF
DNF	Brazil: (Sérgio da Silva) / (43); (Daniel Ferreira) / (70); (Elias Bastos) / (81); (Sergio Couto) / (DNF)	DNF
DNF	Papua New Guinea: (David Kanie) / (154); (Gumsie Taulobi) / (162); (Ken Mova) / (163); (David Rueben) / (DNF)	DNF

- Note: Athletes in parentheses did not score for the team result

== Participation ==
An unofficial count yields the participation of 181 athletes from 46 countries in the Senior men's race. This is in agreement with the official numbers as published.

- Algeria (6)
- Andorra (1)
- Armenia (1)
- Australia (6)
- Belgium (1)
- Botswana (6)
- Brazil (4)
- Burundi (1)
- Canada (6)
- Central African Republic (1)
- Colombia (4)
- Costa Rica (1)
- Côte d'Ivoire (4)
- Egypt (6)
- Estonia (5)
- Ethiopia (6)
- Finland (4)
- France (6)
- Gabon (6)
- Hong Kong (1)
- Hungary (1)
- Ireland (5)
- Italy (5)
- Japan (4)
- Kenya (6)
- Libya (4)
- Mauritius (1)
- Mexico (5)
- Morocco (6)
- Namibia (3)
- Netherlands (5)
- Papua New Guinea (4)
- Poland (1)
- Portugal (6)
- Russia (2)
- Rwanda (6)
- South Africa (4)
- Spain (6)
- Switzerland (2)
- Tajikistan (1)
- Tanzania (5)
- Turkmenistan (3)
- United Kingdom (6)
- United States (6)
- Yugoslavia (2)
- Zimbabwe (6)

== See also ==
- 1998 IAAF World Cross Country Championships – Men's short race
- 1998 IAAF World Cross Country Championships – Junior men's race
- 1998 IAAF World Cross Country Championships – Senior women's race
- 1998 IAAF World Cross Country Championships – Women's short race
- 1998 IAAF World Cross Country Championships – Junior women's race
