= Athletics at the 1996 Summer Olympics – Men's 5000 metres =

Men's 5000 metres at the Games of the XXVI Olympiad
- Venue: Centennial Olympic Stadium
- Date: 31 July 1996 (heats); 1 August 1996 (semi-finals); 3 August 1996 (final)
- Competitors: 37 from 23 nations
- Winning time: 13:07.96

Medalists
1st place, gold medalist(s)		Vénuste Niyongabo; Burundi
2nd place, silver medalist(s)		Paul Bitok; Kenya
3rd place, bronze medalist(s)		Khalid Boulami; Morocco

These are the official results of the men's 5000 metres at the 1996 Summer Olympics in Atlanta. The event took place between 31 July and 3 August.

== Medalists ==
Gold	Vénuste Niyongabo; Burundi
Silver	Paul Bitok; Kenya
Bronze	Khalid Boulami; Morocco

== Summary ==
After a diverse semi-final round where one heat ran a modest 14 minute strategic race and the other ran over thirty seconds faster, some athletes had an easier time of qualifying for the final.

At the gun, the entire Moroccan team went to the front, but then controlled the pace. After a lap at the back of the pack, Kenyan Tom Nyariki ran around the field to take the lead. German Dieter Baumann hung on his shoulder as it looked like an early attempt to steal the race with a quick breakaway. Several others in the field scrambled forward while Nyariki, shadowed by his teammate Shem Kororia pushed the pace, exchanging the lead position and stringing out the field into single file. American Bob Kennedy marked this action hovering around second place. With four laps to go, after an exchange of Kenyan leaders, Burundi's Vénuste Niyongabo moved into second place, squeezing back Kennedy into third. Over the next lap, Nyariki and Moroccan Brahim Lahlafi got past Kennedy. Just before two laps to go, Kennedy ran around the group and into the lead. Kennedy led for the first 300 metres of the penultimate lap before Niyongabo passed him coming off the turn, followed by the designated kickers who had protected their interests at the back of the pack; Paul Bitok (Kenya), Khalid Boulami (Morocco) and Baumann. But as one of the fastest 1500 meter runners in the world at the time, Niyongabo had the position and more speed, opening up a 5-metre gap on Boulami. At the beginning of the final turn, Bitok got around Boulami and everybody sprinted for home. Nobody was able to make any progress except that Niyongabo slowed on the final straight to celebrate Burundi's first gold medal.

== Records ==
These were the standing world and Olympic records (in minutes) prior to the 1996 Summer Olympics.

World record	12:44.39	(Ethiopia) Haile Gebrselassie	Zürich (SUI)	August 16, 1995
Olympic record	13:05.59	(Morocco) Saïd Aouita	Los Angeles (USA)	August 11, 1984

== Results ==
=== Heats ===
Qualification: First 8 in each heat (Q) and the next 6 fastest (q) qualified to the semifinals.

Rank	Heat	Name	Nationality	Time	Notes
1	2	Fita Bayisa	Ethiopia	13:50.61	Q
2	2	Brahim Lahlafi	Morocco	13:51.25	Q
3	2	Tom Nyariki	Kenya	13:51.47	Q
4	2	Enrique Molina	Spain	13:51.55	Q
5	2	Aïssa Belaout	Algeria	13:51.96	Q
6	2	Dieter Baumann	Germany	13:52.00	Q
7	2	John Nuttall	Great Britain	13:52.16	Q
8	2	Jonathan Wyatt	New Zealand	13:52.56	Q
9	2	Jim Spivey	United States	13:53.16	q
10	2	Cormac Finnerty	Ireland	13:54.01	q
11	3	John Morapedi	South Africa	13:54.30	Q
12	3	Paul Bitok	Kenya	13:54.45	Q
13	3	Vénuste Niyongabo	Burundi	13:54.53	Q
14	3	Bob Kennedy	United States	13:54.57	Q
15	3	Khalid Boulami	Morocco	13:54.72	Q
16	3	Miroslav Vanko	Slovakia	13:54.88	Q
17	3	Assefa Mezgebu	Ethiopia	13:54.89	Q
18	3	Stefano Baldini	Italy	13:55.41	Q
19	3	Manuel Pancorbo	Spain	13:57.42	q
20	2	Julian Paynter	Australia	14:00.25	q
21	1	Ismaïl Sghyr	Morocco	14:02.71	Q
22	1	Shem Kororia	Kenya	14:02.75	Q
23	1	Réda Benzine	Algeria	14:03.06	Q
24	1	Gennaro Di Napoli	Italy	14:03.56	Q
25	1	Shaun Creighton	Australia	14:04.08	Q
26	1	Shadrack Hoff	South Africa	14:05.97	Q
27	3	Stéphane Franke	Germany	14:06.34	q
28	3	Luís Jesus	Portugal	14:08.87	q
29	3	Khmees Abdalla Seif Eldin	Sudan	14:15.21	
30	1	Anacleto Jiménez	Spain	14:16.57	Q
31	1	José Ramos	Portugal	14:17.26	Q
32	2	Adalberto García	Brazil	14:28.64	
33	2	Henry Moyo	Malawi	14:30.53	
34	1	Matt Giusto	United States	14:30.76	
35	1	William Roldán	Colombia	14:39.50	
36	3	Aboukar Hassan Adani	Somalia	15:19.80	
37	1	Sid'Ahmed Ould Mohamedou	Mauritania	15:29.16	
	1	Haile Gebrselassie	Ethiopia	DNS	
	1	Armando Quintanilla	Mexico	DNS	
	2	Aloÿs Nizigama	Burundi	DNS	
	3	Alyan Al-Qahtani	Saudi Arabia	DNS	

=== Semifinals ===
Qualification: First 6 in each heat (Q) and the next 3 fastest (q) qualified to the final.

Rank	Heat	Name	Nationality	Time	Notes
1	1	Shem Kororia	Kenya	13:27.50	Q
2	1	Paul Bitok	Kenya	13:27.61	Q
3	1	Brahim Lahlafi	Morocco	13:27.73	Q
4	1	Bob Kennedy	United States	13:27.90	Q
5	1	Gennaro Di Napoli	Italy	13:28.80	Q
6	1	Khalid Boulami	Morocco	13:29.72	Q
7	1	Fita Bayisa	Ethiopia	13:30.88	q
8	1	Réda Benzine	Algeria	13:37.52	q
9	1	Stéphane Franke	Germany	13:40.94	q
10	1	Jonathan Wyatt	New Zealand	13:47.81	
11	1	Anacleto Jiménez	Spain	13:50.90	
12	1	Miroslav Vanko	Slovakia	13:51.45	
13	1	John Morapedi	South Africa	13:54.43	
14	1	Shaun Creighton	Australia	13:55.23	
15	2	Tom Nyariki	Kenya	14:03.21	Q
16	2	Vénuste Niyongabo	Burundi	14:03.48	Q
17	2	Dieter Baumann	Germany	14:03.75	Q
18	2	Enrique Molina	Spain	14:04.08	Q
19	2	Ismaïl Sghyr	Morocco	14:04.23	Q
20	2	Aïssa Belaout	Algeria	14:04.56	Q
21	2	Assefa Mezgebu	Ethiopia	14:05.48	
22	2	Stefano Baldini	Italy	14:06.45	
23	2	John Nuttall	Great Britain	14:08.39	
24	2	Cormac Finnerty	Ireland	14:08.88	
25	2	Shadrack Hoff	South Africa	14:16.14	
26	1	José Ramos	Portugal	14:24.81	
27	2	Jim Spivey	United States	14:27.72	
28	2	Julian Paynter	Australia	14:23.60	
29	2	Manuel Pancorbo	Spain	14:39.64	
	2	Luís Jesus	Portugal	DNS	

=== Final ===
Rank	Name	Nationality	Time	Notes
1st place, gold medalist(s)	Vénuste Niyongabo	Burundi	13:07.96	
2nd place, silver medalist(s)	Paul Bitok	Kenya	13:08.16	
3rd place, bronze medalist(s)	Khalid Boulami	Morocco	13:08.37	
4	Dieter Baumann	Germany	13:08.81	
5	Tom Nyariki	Kenya	13:12.29	
6	Bob Kennedy	United States	13:12.35	
7	Enrique Molina	Spain	13:12.91	
8	Brahim Lahlafi	Morocco	13:13.26	
9	Shem Kororia	Kenya	13:14.63	
10	Fita Bayisa	Ethiopia	13:18.30	
11	Ismaïl Sghyr	Morocco	13:22.89	
12	Gennaro Di Napoli	Italy	13:28.36	
13	Réda Benzine	Algeria	13:42.34	
14	Stéphane Franke	Germany	13:44.64	
15	Aïssa Belaout	Algeria	14:06.52	

== See also ==
- 1994 Men's European Championships 5.000 metres (Helsinki)
- 1995 Men's World Championships 5.000 metres (Gothenburg)
- 1997 Men's World Championships 5.000 metres (Athens)
- 1998 Men's European Championships 5.000 metres (Budapest)
