= 1997 World Championships in Athletics – Men's 5000 metres =

These are the official results of the Men's 5.000 metres event at the 1997 World Championships in Athens, Greece. There were a total of 38 participating athletes, with two qualifying heats and the final held on Saturday August 9, 1997.

== Final ==
RANK	FINAL	TIME
	Daniel Komen (KEN)	13:07.38
	Khalid Boulami (MAR)	13:09.34
	Tom Nyariki (KEN)	13:11.09
4.	Ismaïl Sghyr (MAR)	13:17.45
5.	Dieter Baumann (GER)	13:17.64
6.	Bob Kennedy (USA)	13:19.45
7.	El Hassan Lahssini (MAR)	13:20.52
8.	Enrique Molina (ESP)	13:24.54
9.	Manuel Pancorbo (ESP)	13:25.78
10.	Fita Bayissa (ETH)	13:25.98
11.	Abdellah Béhar (FRA)	13:29.10
12.	Worku Bikila (ETH)	13:30.02
13.	Paul Bitok (KEN)	13:30.25
14.	Dionisio Castro (POR)	13:31.74
15.	Pablo Olmedo (MEX)	14:05.59

== Qualifying heats ==
- Held on Friday 1997-08-08

RANK	HEAT 1	TIME
1.	Ismaïl Sghyr (MAR)	13:19.69
2.	Dieter Baumann (GER)	13:19.81
3.	Daniel Komen (KEN)	13:19.87
4.	Enrique Molina (ESP)	13:22.74
5.	Paul Bitok (KEN)	13:24.85
6.	Abdellah Béhar (FRA)	13:26.50
7.	Worku Bikila (ETH)	13:31.18
8.	Alan Culpepper (USA)	13:34.74
9.	Anacleto Jimenez (ESP)	13:36.55
10.	Keith Cullen (GBR)	13:42.40
11.	Warsama Ahmed Ibrahim (QAT)	13:49.55
12.	Sergey Drygin (RUS)	13:55.56
13.	Jeff Schiebler (CAN)	13:57.31
14.	Mark Carroll (IRL)	13:57.88
15.	Robert Denmark (GBR)	13:58.08
16.	Ali Zayed (LBA)	13:58.26
17.	Nestor García (URU)	14:12.15
18.	Francis Munthali (MAW)	14:14.80
—	Jonathan Wyatt (NZL)	DNF
—	Marco Condori (BOL)	DNS

RANK	HEAT 2	TIME
1.	Bob Kennedy (USA)	13:23.07
2.	Khalid Boulami (MAR)	13:23.46
3.	Tom Nyariki (KEN)	13:23.55
4.	El Hassan Lahssini (MAR)	13:23.75
5.	Dionisio Castro (POR)	13:24.51
6.	Manuel Pancorbo (ESP)	13:25.71
7.	Pablo Olmedo (MEX)	13:27.65
8.	Fita Bayissa (ETH)	13:28.54
9.	Ismael Kirui (KEN)	13:34.52
10.	Ayele Mezgebu (ETH)	13:38.96
11.	Mustapha Essaid (FRA)	13:39.11
12.	Panagiotis Papoulias (GRE)	13:58.27
13.	Brian Baker (USA)	14:03.95
14.	Adrian Passey (GBR)	14:07.49
15.	Samuli Vasala (FIN)	14:10.92
16.	Yohannes Ghirmai (ERI)	14:59.47
17.	Anatola Lekade (TOG)	15:00.21
18.	Yeli Moussa (NIG)	15:00.61

== See also ==
- 1996 Men's Olympic 5.000 metres
