= 5000 metres at the World Athletics Championships =

Event at the world championships in athletics

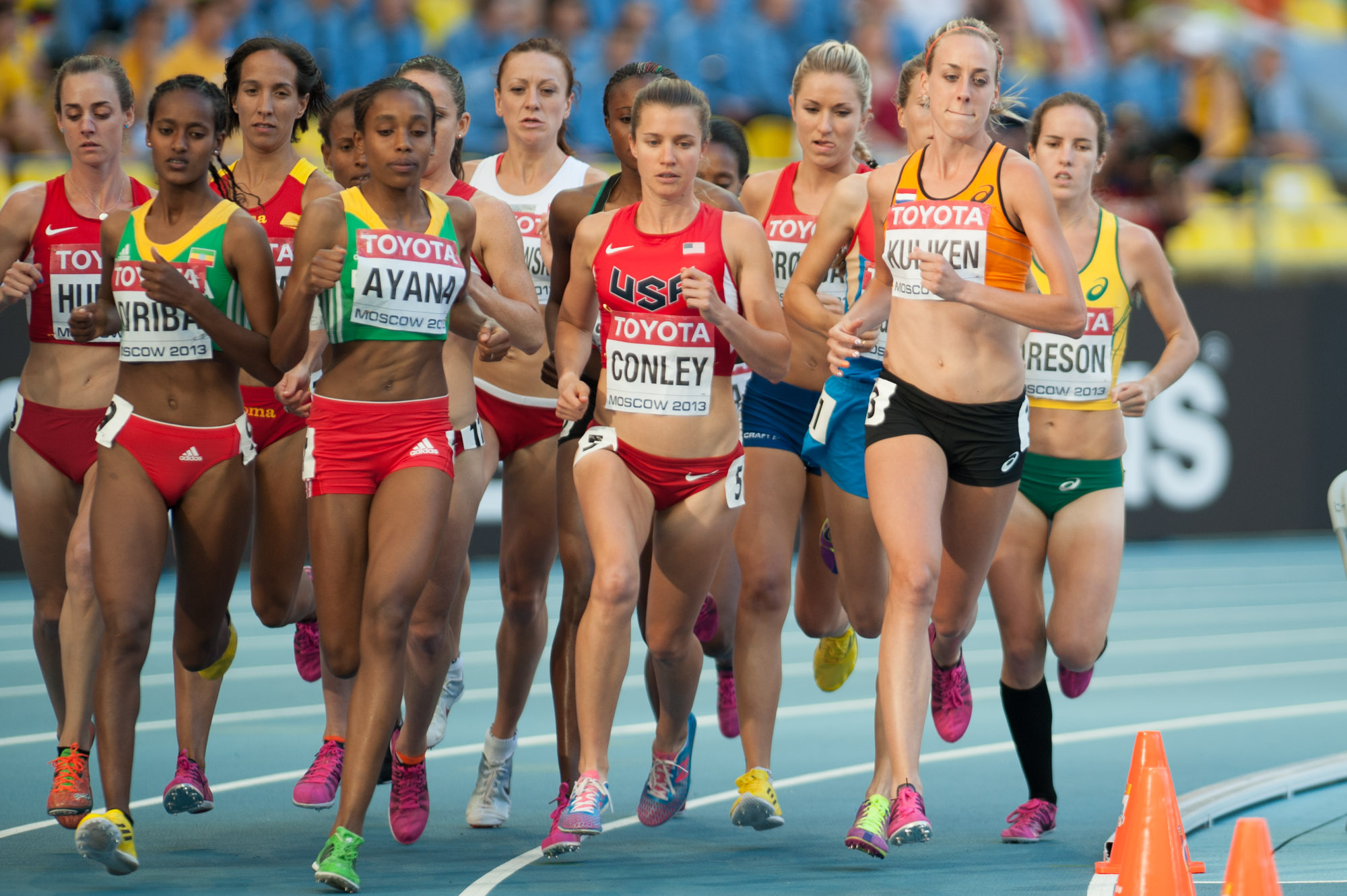
- Women competing in the 2013 final

Overview
- Gender: Men and women
- Years held: Men: 1983 – 2023; Women: 1995 – 2023

Championship record
- Men: 12:52.79 Eliud Kipchoge (2003)
- Women: 14:26.72 Hellen Obiri (2019)

Reigning champion
- Men: Cole Hocker (USA)
- Women: Faith Kipyegon (KEN)

The 5000 metres at the World Championships in Athletics has been contested by men since the inaugural edition in 1983 and by women since 1995. Women competed over 3000 metres from 1980 to 1993, in line with championship standards of the time. It is the shortest long-distance running event at the competition, the 10,000 metres and marathon being the other two such events on the programme. It is the second most prestigious title in the discipline after the 5000 metres at the Olympics. The competition format typically has a two-race heats stage that leads directly to a final between fifteen athletes.

The championship records for the event are 12:52.79 minutes for men, set by Eliud Kipchoge in 2003, and 14:26.72 minutes for women, set by Hellen Obiri in 2019. The world record has never been broken or equalled at the competition by either men or women, reflecting the lack of pacemaking and athletes' more tactical approach to championship races. Similarly the women's 3000 metres world record was not improved during its 13-year history. The championship record for that event was set on its last appearance in 1993, by Yunxia Qu with a time of 8:28.71 minutes.

The women's 3000 m was among the first ever IAAF World Championship events as it was one of two designated events at the 1980 World Championships in Athletics (alongside women's 400 metres hurdles), which was held after the International Olympic Committee refused to add the women's event to the Olympic programme that year.

Mo Farah of Great Britain is the only athlete to win this title three times, between 2011 and 2015. Meseret Defar is the most successful female athlete of the event, having won two world championship titles and reached the medal podium five times consecutively from 2005 to 2013. Vivian Cheruiyot is the next most successful with two golds and one silver. Six other athletes have won the 5000 m championship twice: Ismael Kirui, Muktar Edris and Jakob Ingebrigtsen on the men's side, and Gabriela Szabo, Tirunesh Dibaba and Hellen Obiri on the women's side. Tatyana Dorovskikh was also a double champion in the women's 3000 m, and the only woman to win multiple medals over that distance.

Kenya is the most successful nation in the discipline, with seven wins in the men's distance and five in the women's, and has the highest medal total at 30. Ethiopia is the next best performer with six women's titles, three men's titles and 30 medals overall. Morocco, Great Britain, Romania, Ireland and Norway are the other nations to have won multiple gold medals in the 5000 m. The Soviet Union won the most 3000 m medals during its run, with two titles and four medals. China produced a medal sweep in 1993. Eamonn Coghlan and Jakob Ingebrigtsen are the only non-African-born men to win the 5000 m.

== Age ==
- All information from World Athletics.

Distinction	Male			Female		
Distinction	Athlete	Age	Date	Athlete	Age	Date
Youngest champion	Ismael Kirui (KEN)	18 years, 177 days	16 Aug 1993	Tirunesh Dibaba (ETH)	17 years, 333 days	30 Aug 2003
Youngest medalist	Ismael Kirui (KEN)	18 years, 177 days	16 Aug 1993	Tirunesh Dibaba (ETH)	17 years, 333 days	30 Aug 2003
Youngest finalist	Selemon Barega (ETH)	17 years, 204 days	12 Aug 2017	Sally Barsosio (KEN)	17 years, 144 days	12 Aug 1995
Youngest participant	Abdullah Al-Qwabani (YEM)	16 years, 177 days	26 Aug 2015	Wisam El-Bekheet (PLE)	14 years, 281 days	9 Aug 2001
Oldest champion	Bernard Lagat (USA)	32 years, 264 days	2 Sep 2007	Hellen Obiri (KEN)	29 years, 296 days	5 Oct 2019
Oldest medalist	Bernard Lagat (USA)	36 years, 266 days	4 Sep 2011	Edith Masai (KEN)	36 years, 148 days	30 Aug 2003
Oldest finalist	Bernard Lagat (USA)	38 years, 247 days	16 Aug 2013	Teresa Récio (ESP)	38 years, 35 days	11 Aug 2001
Oldest participant	Bernard Lagat (USA)	38 years, 247 days	16 Aug 2013	Nora Rocha (MEX)	39 years, 254 days	29 Aug 2007

== Doping ==
The World Championship 5000 metres was unaffected by doping until the 2001, when men's silver medallist Ali Saïdi-Sief of Algeria failed his post-race urine test due to nandrolone traces. He was stripped of his medal. Only one other competitor has been disqualified from the 5000 m for doping: Turkey's Alemitu Bekele Degfa, whose unsuccessful run in the heats in 2011 was annulled retrospectively after biological passport irregularities.

Among those failing tests outside the competition was 1983 men's bronze medallist Martti Vainio, who admitted to using testosterone supplements and failed a test for steroids in 1984. Marta Domínguez, the women's runner-up in 2001 and 2003, was banned later in her career for abnormalities in her biological passport readings. Additionally, 2023 silver medalist Mohamed Katir was suspended in February 2024 for whereabouts failures.

In the women's 3000 m, no athletes were banned during World Championships competition but 1983 medallist Tatyana Kazankina ended her career in 1984 by refusing a drug test, while the 1987 and 1991 world champion for the distance Tetyana Dorovskikh also ended her career with a drugs ban in 1993. The 1983 women's champion Mary Decker was another banned for doping later in her career.

== Medalists ==
=== Men ===
Championships	Gold	Silver	Bronze
1983 Helsinki	Eamonn Coghlan (IRL)	Werner Schildhauer (GDR)	Martti Vainio (FIN)
1987 Rome	Saïd Aouita (MAR)	Domingos Castro (POR)	Jack Buckner (GBR)
1991 Tokyo	Yobes Ondieki (KEN)	Fita Bayisa (ETH)	Brahim Boutayeb (MAR)
1993 Stuttgart	Ismael Kirui (KEN)	Haile Gebrselassie (ETH)	Fita Bayisa (ETH)
1995 Gothenburg	Ismael Kirui (KEN)	Khalid Boulami (MAR)	Shem Kororia (KEN)
1997 Athens	Daniel Komen (KEN)	Khalid Boulami (MAR)	Tom Nyariki (KEN)
1999 Seville	Salah Hissou (MAR)	Benjamin Limo (KEN)	Mohammed Mourhit (BEL)
2001 Edmonton	Richard Limo (KEN)	Million Wolde (ETH)	John Kibowen (KEN)
2003 Saint-Denis	Eliud Kipchoge (KEN)	Hicham El Guerrouj (MAR)	Kenenisa Bekele (ETH)
2005 Helsinki	Benjamin Limo (KEN)	Sileshi Sihine (ETH)	Craig Mottram (AUS)
2007 Osaka	Bernard Lagat (USA)	Eliud Kipchoge (KEN)	Moses Kipsiro (UGA)
2009 Berlin	Kenenisa Bekele (ETH)	Bernard Lagat (USA)	James Kwalia (QAT)
2011 Daegu	Mo Farah (GBR)	Bernard Lagat (USA)	Dejen Gebremeskel (ETH)
2013 Moscow	Mo Farah (GBR)	Hagos Gebrhiwet (ETH)	Isiah Koech (KEN)
2015 Beijing	Mo Farah (GBR)	Caleb Ndiku (KEN)	Hagos Gebrhiwet (ETH)
2017 London	Muktar Edris (ETH)	Mo Farah (GBR)	Paul Chelimo (USA)
2019 Doha	Muktar Edris (ETH)	Selemon Barega (ETH)	Mohammed Ahmed (CAN)
2022 Eugene	Jakob Ingebrigtsen (NOR)	Jacob Krop (KEN)	Oscar Chelimo (UGA)
2023 Budapest	Jakob Ingebrigtsen (NOR)	Mohamed Katir (ESP)	Jacob Krop (KEN)

==== Multiple medalists ====
Rank	Athlete	Nation	Period	Gold	Silver	Bronze	Total
1	Mo Farah	Great Britain (GBR)	2011–2015	3	1	0	4
2	Ismael Kirui	Kenya (KEN)	1993–1995	2	0	0	2
2	Muktar Edris	Ethiopia (ETH)	2017–2019	2	0	0	2
2	Jakob Ingebrigtsen	Norway (NOR)	2022-2023	2	0	0	2
5	Bernard Lagat	United States (USA)	2007–2011	1	2	0	3
6	Benjamin Limo	Kenya (KEN)	2003–2009	1	1	0	2
7	Kenenisa Bekele	Ethiopia (ETH)	1999–2005	1	0	1	2
8	Khalid Boulami	Morocco (MAR)	1995–1997	0	2	0	2
9	Fita Bayisa	Ethiopia (ETH)	1991–1993	0	1	1	2
9	Hagos Gebrhiwet	Ethiopia (ETH)	2013-2015	0	1	1	2
9	Jacob Krop	Kenya (KEN)	2022-2023	0	1	1	2

==== Medalists by country ====
Rank	Nation	Gold	Silver	Bronze	Total
1	Kenya (KEN)	7	4	5	16
2	Ethiopia (ETH)	3	6	4	13
3	Great Britain (GBR)	3	1	1	5
4	Morocco (MAR)	2	3	1	6
5	Norway (NOR)	2	0	0	2
6	United States (USA)	1	2	1	4
7	Ireland (IRL)	1	0	0	1
8	East Germany (GDR)	0	1	0	1
8	Portugal (POR)	0	1	0	1
8	Spain (ESP)	0	1	0	1
11	Uganda (UGA)	0	0	2	2
12	Australia (AUS)	0	0	1	1
12	Belgium (BEL)	0	0	1	1
12	Finland (FIN)	0	0	1	1
12	Qatar (QAT)	0	0	1	1

=== Women's 5000 metres ===
Championships	Gold	Silver	Bronze
1995 Gothenburg	Sonia O'Sullivan (IRL)	Fernanda Ribeiro (POR)	Zahra Ouaziz (MAR)
1997 Athens	Gabriela Szabo (ROU)	Roberta Brunet (ITA)	Fernanda Ribeiro (POR)
1999 Seville	Gabriela Szabo (ROU)	Zahra Ouaziz (MAR)	Ayelech Worku (ETH)
2001 Edmonton	Olga Yegorova (RUS)	Marta Dominguez (ESP)	Ayelech Worku (ETH)
2003 Saint-Denis	Tirunesh Dibaba (ETH)	Marta Dominguez (ESP)	Edith Masai (KEN)
2005 Helsinki	Tirunesh Dibaba (ETH)	Meseret Defar (ETH)	Ejegayehu Dibaba (ETH)
2007 Osaka	Meseret Defar (ETH)	Vivian Cheruiyot (KEN)	Priscah Jepleting Cherono (KEN)
2009 Berlin	Vivian Cheruiyot (KEN)	Sylvia Jebiwott Kibet (KEN)	Meseret Defar (ETH)
2011 Daegu	Vivian Cheruiyot (KEN)	Sylvia Jebiwott Kibet (KEN)	Meseret Defar (ETH)
2013 Moscow	Meseret Defar (ETH)	Mercy Cherono (KEN)	Almaz Ayana (ETH)
2015 Beijing	Almaz Ayana (ETH)	Senbere Teferi (ETH)	Genzebe Dibaba (ETH)
2017 London	Hellen Obiri (KEN)	Almaz Ayana (ETH)	Sifan Hassan (NED)
2019 Doha	Hellen Obiri (KEN)	Margaret Kipkemboi (KEN)	Konstanze Klosterhalfen (GER)
2022 Eugene	Gudaf Tsegay (ETH)	Beatrice Chebet (KEN)	Dawit Seyaum (ETH)
2023 Budapest	Faith Kipyegon (KEN)	Sifan Hassan (NED)	Beatrice Chebet (KEN)

==== Multiple medalists ====
Rank	Athlete	Nation	Period	Gold	Silver	Bronze	Total
1	Meseret Defar	Ethiopia (ETH)	2005–2013	2	1	2	5
2	Vivian Cheruiyot	Kenya (KEN)	2007–2011	2	1	0	3
3	Hellen Obiri	Kenya (KEN)	2017-2019	2	0	0	2
3	Gabriela Szabo	Romania (ROU)	1997–1999	2	0	0	2
3	Tirunesh Dibaba	Ethiopia (ETH)	2003–2005	2	0	0	2
6	Almaz Ayana	Ethiopia (ETH)	2013–2017	1	1	1	3
7	Marta Domínguez	Spain (ESP)	2001–2003	0	2	0	2
7	Sylvia Jebiwott Kibet	Kenya (KEN)	2001–2003	0	2	0	2
9	Sifan Hassan	Netherlands (NED)	2017-2023	0	1	1	2
9	Beatrice Chebet	Kenya (KEN)	2022-2023	0	1	1	2
9	Fernanda Ribeiro	Portugal (POR)	1995–1997	0	1	1	2
9	Zahra Ouaziz	Morocco (MAR)	1995–1999	0	1	1	2
13	Ayelech Worku	Ethiopia (ETH)	1999–2001	0	0	2	2

==== Medalists by country ====
Rank	Nation	Gold	Silver	Bronze	Total
1	Ethiopia (ETH)	6	3	8	17
2	Kenya (KEN)	5	6	3	14
3	Romania (ROU)	2	0	0	2
4	Ireland (IRL)	1	0	0	1
4	Russia (RUS)	1	0	0	1
6	Spain (ESP)	0	2	0	2
7	Morocco (MAR)	0	1	1	2
7	Netherlands (NED)	0	1	1	2
7	Portugal (POR)	0	1	1	2
10	Italy (ITA)	0	1	0	1
11	Germany (GER)	0	0	1	1

=== Women's 3000 metres ===
Championships	Gold	Silver	Bronze
1980 Sittard	Birgit Friedmann (FRG)	Karoline Nemetz (SWE)	Ingrid Kristiansen (NOR)
1983 Helsinki	Mary Decker (USA)	Brigitte Kraus (FRG)	Tatyana Kovalenko-Kazankina (URS)
1987 Rome	Tetyana Samolenko (URS)	Maricica Puică (ROU)	Ulrike Bruns (GDR)
1991 Tokyo	Tetyana Dorovskikh (URS)	Yelena Romanova (URS)	Susan Sirma (KEN)
1993 Stuttgart	Qu Yunxia (CHN)	Zhang Linli (CHN)	Zhang Lirong (CHN)

==== Multiple medalists ====
Rank	Athlete	Nation	Period	Gold	Silver	Bronze	Total
1	Tatyana Dorovskikh	Soviet Union (URS)	1987–1991	2	0	0	2

==== Medalists by country ====
Rank	Nation	Gold	Silver	Bronze	Total
1	Soviet Union (URS)	2	1	1	4
2	China (CHN)	1	1	1	3
3	West Germany (FRG)	1	1	0	2
4	United States (USA)	1	0	0	1
5	Romania (ROU)	0	1	0	1
5	Sweden (SWE)	0	1	0	1
7	East Germany (GDR)	0	0	1	1
7	Kenya (KEN)	0	0	1	1
7	Norway (NOR)	0	0	1	1

== Finishing times ==
Top ten fastest world championships times (5000 metres)

Fastest men's times at the World Championships
Rank	Time (sec)	Athlete	Nation	Year	Date
1	12:52.79	Eliud Kipchoge	Kenya	2003	2003-08-31
2	12:52.83	Hicham El Guerrouj	Morocco	2003	2003-08-31
3	12:53.12	Kenenisa Bekele	Ethiopia	2003	2003-08-31
4	12:54.07	John Kibowen	Kenya	2003	2003-08-31
5	12:57.74	Abraham Chebii	Kenya	2003	2003-08-31
6	12:58.08	Gebregziabher Gebremariam	Ethiopia	2003	2003-08-31
7	12:58.13	Salah Hissou	Morocco	1999	1999-08-28
8	12:58.72	Benjamin Limo	Kenya	1999	1999-08-28
9	12:58.80	Mohammed Mourhit	Belgium	1999	1999-08-28
10	12:58.85	Muktar Edris	Ethiopia	2019	2003-09-30

Fastest women's times at the World Championships
Rank	Time (sec)	Athlete	Nation	Year	Date
1	14:26.72	Hellen Obiri	Kenya	2019	2019-10-05
2	14:26.84	Almaz Ayana	Ethiopia	2015	2015-08-30
3	14:27.49	Margaret Chelimo Kipkemboi	Kenya	2019	2019-10-05
4	14:28.43	Konstanze Klosterhalfen	Germany	2019	2019-10-05
5	14:29.60	Tsehay Gemechu	Ethiopia	2019	2019-10-05
6	14:32.29	Sifan Hassan	Netherlands	2023^{H}	2023-08-26
7	14:32.31	Faith Kipyegon	Kenya	2023^{H}	2023-08-26
8	14:33.23	Ejgayehu Taye	Ethiopia	2023^{H}	2023-08-26
9	14:34.16	Freweyni Hailu	Ethiopia	2023^{H}	2023-08-26
10	14:34.86	Hellen Obiri	Kenya	2017	2017-08-13

== Championship record progression ==
=== Men ===
Men's 5000 metres World Championships record progression
Time	Athlete	Nation	Year	Round	Date
13:43.36	Markus Ryffel	Switzerland (SUI)	1983	First round	10 August
13:32.34	Markus Ryffel	Switzerland (SUI)	1983	Semi-final	12 August
13:31.40	Dmitriy Dmitriyev	Soviet Union (URS)	1983	Semi-final	12 August
13:28.53	Eamon Coghlan	Ireland (IRL)	1983	Final	14 August
13:22.68	John Ngugi	Kenya (KEN)	1987	Heats	4 September
13:14.45	Yobes Ondieki	Kenya (KEN)	1991	Final	1 September
13:02.75	Ismael Kirui	Kenya (KEN)	1993	Final	16 August
12:58.12	Salah Hissou	Morocco (MAR)	1999	Final	28 August
12:52.79	Eliud Kipchoge	Kenya (KEN)	2003	Final	31 August

=== Women 5000 metres ===
Women's 5000 metres World Championships record progression
Time	Athlete	Nation	Year	Round	Date
15:36.39	Elena Fidatov	Romania (ROU)	1995	Heats	10 August
15:13.88	Sonia O'Sullivan	Ireland (IRL)	1995	Heats	10 August
14:46.47	Sonia O'Sullivan	Ireland (IRL)	1995	Final	10 August
14:41.82	Gabriela Szabo	Romania (ROU)	1999	Final	27 August
14:38.59	Tirunesh Dibaba	Ethiopia (ETH)	2005	Final	13 August
14:26.83	Almaz Ayana	Ethiopia (ETH)	2015	Final	30 August
14:26.72	Hellen Obiri	Kenya (KEN)	2019	Final	5 October

=== Women 3000 metres ===
Women's 3000 metres World Championships record progression
Time	Athlete	Nation	Year	Round	Date
9:04.7	Aurora Cunha	Portugal (POR)	1980	Heats	14 August
9:04.7	Birgit Friedmann	West Germany (FRG)	1980	Heats	14 August
8:48.05	Birgit Friedmann	West Germany (FRG)	1980	Heats	14 August
8:46.65	Svetlana Ulmasova	Soviet Union (URS)	1983	Heats	8 August
8:44.72	Tatyana Kazankina	Soviet Union (URS)	1983	Heats	8 August
8:34.62	Mary Decker	United States (USA)	1983	Final	8 August
8:28.71	Qu Yunxia	China (CHN)	1993	Final	16 August

== Bibliography ==
- Butler, Mark (2013). IAAF Statistics Book Moscow 2013 (PDF). IAAF. Archived from the original (PDF) on 12 October 2014.
