= 1993 World Championships in Athletics – Men's 5000 metres =

These are the official results of the Men's 5.000 metres event at the 1993 IAAF World Championships in Stuttgart, Germany. There were a total number of 42 participating athletes, with three qualifying heats and the final held on Monday 1993-08-16.

== Final ==
This 5,000-metre final was run at a consistently fast pace from the start, which quickly broke up the 15-man field. The Kenyans and Ethiopians used team tactics and successive surges in order to try to exhaust each other. Kenya's Michael Chesire led at a suicidal pace in 2:31.76 at 1,000 metres. Ismael Kirui passed the tiring Chesire around 1,700 metres. At 2,000 metres, Kirui was leading in 5:11.27. The only non-African runner who was still in contention was Rob Denmark of Britain. Soon after 2,000 metres, however, for example Denmark started to lose contact with the leading group, as Kirui surged away from his opponents. By 2,400 metres (his unofficial split time was 6:11.48), the teenage Kenyan champion had already stretched his lead over the chasing group to 40 metres! Kirui continued his mercilessly quick pace as he passed 3,000 metres in a wide lead in 7:45.62. Only several African runners, including Skah and the three Ethiopians, Haile Gebrselassie, Fita Bayisa, and Worku Bikila, were able to remain in the chasing group. Shortly after 3,000 metres, the chasing group was reduced to four runners: Skah and the Ethiopians. They took turns passing each other, but none of them was able to break away from the other chasers at this point, nor to reduce Kirui's stunning lead to any noticeable extent. Despite slowing down slightly, the young Kenyan led at 4,000 metres in 10:26.85 - with the chasing group still around 35 to 40 metres behind him. At 4,600 metres, Kirui led in 12:03.16. At last the Ethiopians had been able to reduce his lead to between three and four seconds. Their relentless surges finally caused Skah to drop from the chasing group on the final lap's back straight. Also Bikila started to fall behind his team mates Bayisa and Gebrselassie. This Ethiopian duo was still about 20 metres from Kirui at 4,800 metres. By 4,900 metres, they had been able to reduce the Kenyan's lead to 15 metres. On the home straight, Gebrselassie finally broke away from Bayisa, and with a middle-distance runner's speed he began to close in on Kirui. However, the Kenyan teenager was able to defeat the young Ethiopian, because the latter runner began his final sprint too late. (See the following video about the race: https://www.youtube.com/watch?v=YoE39BByKpM 1993 World Championships 5000m Men's Final, Stuttgart, Germany (the user: T & F archive).)

RANK	FINAL	TIME
	Ismael Kirui (KEN)	13:02.75
	Haile Gebrselassie (ETH)	13:03.17
	Fita Bayisa (ETH)	13:05.40
4.	Worku Bikila (ETH)	13:06.64
5.	Khalid Skah (MAR)	13:07.18
6.	Brahim Jabbour (MAR)	13:18.87
7.	Aloÿs Nizigama (BDI)	13:20.59
8.	Paul Bitok (KEN)	13:23.41
9.	Robert Denmark (GBR)	13:27.09
10.	Mathias Ntawulikura (RWA)	13:28.58
11.	Abel Antón (ESP)	13:40.21
12.	Jonny Danielson (SWE)	13:40.59
13.	Zoltán Káldy (HUN)	13:43.02
14.	Michael Chesire (KEN)	13:44.11
—	Aïssa Belaout (ALG)	DNF

== Qualifying heats ==
- Held on Saturday 1993-08-14

RANK	HEAT 1	TIME
1.	Robert Denmark (GBR)	13:41.55
2.	Paul Bitok (KEN)	13:41.57
3.	Fita Bayisa (ETH)	13:41.61
4.	Khalid Skah (MAR)	13:41.72
5.	Bob Kennedy (USA)	13:42.17
6.	Carlos Monteiro (POR)	13:44.96
7.	Rainer Wachenbrunner (GER)	13:46.43
8.	Toshinari Takaoka (JPN)	13:46.86
9.	Andrey Tikhonov (RUS)	13:53.25
10.	Alyan Sultan Al-Qahtani (KSA)	13:56.59
11.	Phil Clode (NZL)	13:56.94
12.	Murusamy Ramachandran (MAS)	14:33.22
13.	Keiruan Tawai (VAN)	15:43.73
—	James Lynch (AHO)	DNF

RANK	HEAT 2	TIME
1.	Worku Bikila (ETH)	13:27.14
2.	Ismael Kirui (KEN)	13:27.50
3.	Aloÿs Nizigama (BDI)	13:34.72
4.	Mathias Ntawulikura (RWA)	13:36.66
5.	Mustapha Essaid (FRA)	13:40.21
6.	Brahim Boutayeb (MAR)	13:42.30
7.	Jon Brown (GBR)	13:46.20
8.	Michał Bartoszak (POL)	13:52.95
9.	Bahadur Prasad (IND)	13:53.39
10.	Peter O'Donoghue (AUS)	14:12.99
11.	Thein Win Gopal (MYA)	14:14.62
12.	Valdenor dos Santos (BRA)	14:39.29
13.	Prakash Davendra Singh (FIJ)	15:01.72
—	Ovidiu Olteanu (ROM)	DNF

RANK	HEAT 3	TIME
1.	Haile Gebrselassie (ETH)	13:25.27
2.	Brahim Jabbour (MAR)	13:26.06
3.	Michael Chesire (KEN)	13:26.13
4.	Aïssa Belaout (ALG)	13:29.12
5.	Abel Antón (ESP)	13:30.32
6.	Jonny Danielson (SWE)	13:34.05
7.	Zoltán Káldy (HUN)	13:37.20
8.	Phillimon Hanneck (ZIM)	13:49.42
9.	Jan Pesava (CZE)	14:02.00
10.	John Nuttall (GBR)	14:11.30
11.	Greg Whiteley (USA)	14:11.48
12.	Ahmad Zarekar (IRI)	14:48.07
13.	Souley Oumarou (NIG)	15:29.14
—	Mohamed Ahmed Moosa (PLE)	DNS

== See also ==
- 1990 Men's European Championships 5.000 metres (Split)
- 1991 Men's World Championships 5.000 metres (Tokyo)
- 1992 Men's Olympic 5.000 metres (Barcelona)
- 1994 Men's European Championships 5.000 metres (Helsinki)
- 1995 Men's World Championships 5.000 metres (Gothenburg)
