= John Nuttall (athlete) =

British long-distance runner (1967–2023)

Personal information
- Born: 11 January 1967 Preston, Lancashire, England
- Died: 9 November 2023 (aged 56) Doha, Qatar

Sport
- Sport: Athletics
- Club: Preston Harriers
Medal record
Athletics
Representing England
Commonwealth Games
Bronze medal – third place	1994 Victoria	5000 m
Representing Great Britain
IAAF World Cup
Silver medal – second place	1994 London	5000 m

John Barry Nuttall (11 January 1967 – 9 November 2023) was a British male long-distance runner who competed in track and cross country running. He competed for Great Britain at the 1996 Summer Olympics. He also represented his country twice at the World Championships in Athletics (1993, 1995) and five times at the IAAF World Cross Country Championships. He was a silver medallist at the 1994 IAAF World Cup and a bronze medallist at the 1994 Commonwealth Games.

== Career ==
Born in Preston, Lancashire, on 11 January 1967, Nuttall proved his ability for running as a teenager: he won the 3000 m at the English Schools' Athletics Championships in a championship record and placed third that same year at the 1985 European Athletics Junior Championships. Further international outings followed, with appearances at the 1986 IAAF World Cross Country Championships and the 1986 World Junior Championships in Athletics. He came close to a medal at the 1989 Summer Universiade, taking fourth place in the 5000 m.

Nuttall won a scholarship to study at Iowa State University and competed collegiately for the Iowa State Cyclones track and field and cross country teams. He suffered injuries in his first couple of years there but was successful later on. His greatest honour while there was a win at the 1989 NCAA Division I Cross Country Championships in which he and teammate Jonah Koech led a one-two for the Cyclones to win the NCAA team title. He won eight Big Eight Conference titles. He was also the 3000 m runner-up at the NCAA Indoor Championships in 1991. He was inducted into the school's hall of fame in 2001.

Nuttall's first senior international appearance came at the 1991 IAAF World Cross Country Championships, where he helped the English team to sixth. After a 3000 m win at the UK Athletics Championships in 1993, his first senior national title, he competed at the 1993 World Championships in Athletics, though he was eliminated in the heats. His most successful year came in 1994. He was Britain's top performer at the 1994 IAAF World Cross Country Championships in 32nd place then claimed fifth place in the 5000 m at the 1994 European Athletics Championships. He took his first major medals over the 5000 m, being the silver medallist at the 1994 IAAF World Cup (behind Brahim Lahlafi) and a bronze medallist at the 1994 Commonwealth Games. His last high-profile international medal was at the 1995 European Cup, where was runner-up for Britain in the 5000 m behind Italy's Gennaro Di Napoli.

Nuttal made his second and final outing at the World Championships in 1995, reaching the 5000 m final and coming 14th. He also ran at the Atlanta Olympics, but did not progress beyond the semi-finals. He had his highest career placing at the 1996 IAAF World Cross Country Championships in 28th to help a British team including Jon Brown, Rob Denmark, Andrew Pearson and Keith Cullen to fifth. That year he had double national success with wins at the English Cross Country Championships and the AAA Championships.

Reaching his thirties, Nuttall made his last high-profile appearance for Great Britain at the 1998 IAAF World Cross Country Championships, but he was lower down the order in 75th place. He continued to run on an informal basis in his late thirties: turning to road running, he completed the 2007 London Marathon in a time of 2:57:26 and finished the Great North Run in 82:32 minutes.

== Personal life ==
Nuttall married fellow English distance runner Alison Wyeth. The couple later divorced and he married another British runner, Liz McColgan. He therefore became stepfather to her daughter, athlete Eilish McColgan.

From his first marriage he had two children, Hannah Nuttall and Luke Nuttall. Hannah and Luke also became runners.

Nuttall was coached by George Gandy and after retirement became a successful running coach.

Nuttall died suddenly from a heart attack in Doha, Qatar, on 9 November 2023. He was 56.

== Personal bests ==
- Mile run: 3:58.83 min (1991)
- 3000 metres: 7:36.40 min (1996)
- 5000 metres: 13:16.70 min (1995)
- 10,000 metres: 28:07.43 min (1995)

== International competitions ==
Year	Competition	Venue	Position	Event	Notes
1985	European Junior Championships	Cottbus, East Germany	3rd	3000 m	8:11.72
1986	World Cross Country Championships	Colombier, Switzerland	35th	Senior race	24:24.4
1986	World Cross Country Championships	Colombier, Switzerland	9th	Senior team	218 pts
1986	World Junior Championships	Athens, Greece	10th	5000 m	14:08.68
1989	Universiade	Duisburg, Germany	4th	5000 m	13:39.80
1991	World Cross Country Championships	Antwerp, Belgium	49th	Senior race	35:17
1991	World Cross Country Championships	Antwerp, Belgium	6th	Senior team	281 pts
1993	World Championships	Stuttgart, Germany	10th (q)	5000 m	14:11.30
1994	World Cross Country Championships	Budapest, Hungary	32nd	Senior race	36:00
1994	World Cross Country Championships	Budapest, Hungary	8th	Senior team	444 pts
1994	European Championships	Helsinki, Finland	5th	5000 m	13:38.65
1994	IAAF World Cup	London, United Kingdom	2nd	5000 m	13:32.47
1994	Commonwealth Games	Victoria, Canada	3rd	5000 m	13:23.54
1995	European Cup	Villeneuve-d'Ascq, France	2nd	5000 m	13:46.82
1995	World Championships	Gothenburg, Sweden	14th	5000 m	13:49.25
1996	World Cross Country Championships	Stellenbosch, South Africa	28th	Senior race	35:38
1996	World Cross Country Championships	Stellenbosch, South Africa	5th	Senior team	252 pts
1996	Olympic Games	Atlanta, United States	9th (semis)	5000 m	14:08.39
1998	World Cross Country Championships	Marrakesh, Morocco	75th	Senior race	37:06
1998	World Cross Country Championships	Marrakesh, Morocco	10th	Senior team	216 pts

== National titles ==
- UK Athletics Championships
  - 3000 m: 1992
- AAA Championships
  - 5000 m: 1996
- English Cross Country Championships
  - Long course: 1996
- NCAA Men's Division I Cross Country Championship
  - Long course: 1989

== See also ==
- List of 5000 metres national champions (men)
- England at the 1994 Commonwealth Games
- Great Britain at the 1996 Summer Olympics
