= Athletics at the 1994 Commonwealth Games – Men's 5000 metres =

Men's 5000 metres at the Commonwealth Games

The men's 5000 metres event at the 1994 Commonwealth Games was held on 22 and 24 August at the Centennial Stadium in Victoria, British Columbia.

== Medalists ==
Gold	Silver	Bronze
Robert Denmark; England	Phillimon Hanneck; Zimbabwe	John Nuttall; England

== Results ==
=== Heats ===
Rank	Heat	Name	Nationality	Time	Notes
1	2	Philip Mosima	Kenya	13:29.37	Q
2	2	Phillimon Hanneck	Zimbabwe	13:31.92	Q
3	2	Jonathan Wyatt	New Zealand	13:33.72	Q
4	2	Jon Brown	England	13:40.62	Q
5	2	John Nuttall	England	13:40.65	Q
6	1	Tendai Chimusasa	Zimbabwe	13:47.88	Q
7	1	Paul Kipsambu	Kenya	13:48.63	Q
8	1	Laban Kipkemboi	Kenya	13:49.18	Q
9	2	Justin Hobbs	Wales	13:50.72	q
10	2	Sipho Dlamini	Swaziland	13:51.57	q
11	1	Jason Bunston	Canada	13:54.51	Q
12	2	Dermot Donnelly	Northern Ireland	13:54.80	q
13	1	Robert Denmark	England	13:59.80	Q
14	2	Chris Weber	Canada	14:00.96	q
15	1	Jeff Schiebler	Canada	14:01.90	q
16	1	James Campbell	Northern Ireland	14:08.41	
17	1	Munusamy Ramachandran	Malaysia	14:46.71	
18	1	Pamenos Ballantyne	Saint Vincent and the Grenadines	14:47.05	
19	2	Kabo Gabaseme	Botswana	14:49.72	
20	2	Andrew Larouche	Malawi	15:09.11	
21	1	Naseer Ismail	Maldives	15:53.97	
	1	Julian Paynter	Australia	DNF	
	2	Godfrey Siamusiye	Zambia	DNF	

=== Final ===
Rank	Name	Nationality	Time	Notes
1st place, gold medalist(s)	Robert Denmark	England	13:23.00	
2nd place, silver medalist(s)	Phillimon Hanneck	Zimbabwe	13:23.20	
3rd place, bronze medalist(s)	John Nuttall	England	13:23.54	
4	Jon Brown	England	13:23.96	
5	Philip Mosima	Kenya	13:24.07	
6	Jonathan Wyatt	New Zealand	13:35.46	
7	Paul Kipsambu	Kenya	13:39.53	
8	Justin Hobbs	Wales	13:45.53	
9	Laban Kipkemboi	Kenya	13:47.34	
10	Jeff Schiebler	Canada	13:50.26	
11	Jason Bunston	Canada	13:50.65	
12	Sipho Dlamini	Swaziland	13:56.62	
13	Chris Weber	Canada	13:57.41	
14	Tendai Chimusasa	Zimbabwe	13:59.36	
15	Dermot Donnelly	Northern Ireland	14:00.00	
