= 1994 IAAF World Cup =

International track and field sporting event

The 7th IAAF World Cup in Athletics was an international track and field sporting event sponsored by the International Association of Athletics Federations, held between 9 and 11 September 1994, at the Crystal Palace National Sports Centre in London, England.

== Overall results ==
=== Men ===
| Pos. | Team | Result |
|---|---|---|
| 1 | Africa | 115 |
| 2 | Great Britain | 111 |
| 3 | Americas | 95 |
| 4 | Europe | 91 |
| 5 | Germany | 85,5 |
| 6 | United States | 78 |
| 7 | Asia | 75 |
| 8 | Oceania | 62,5 |

=== Women ===
| Pos. | Team | Result |
|---|---|---|
| 1 | Europe | 111 |
| 2 | Americas | 98 |
| 3 | Germany | 79 |
| 4 | Africa | 78 |
| 5 | Great Britain | 73 |
| 6 | Asia | 67 |
| 7 | Oceania | 57 |
| 8 | United States | 48 |

== Results summary ==
=== Men ===
| Event | Gold | | Silver | | Bronze | |
|---|---|---|---|---|---|---|
| 100 metres | Linford Christie (GBR); Great Britain | 10.21 | Olapade Adeniken (NGR); Africa | 10.25 | Talal Mansour (QAT); Asia | 10.31 |
| 200 metres | John Regis (GBR); Great Britain | 20.45 | Frankie Fredericks (NAM); Africa | 20.55 | Geir Moen (NOR); Europe | 20.72 |
| 400 metres | Antonio Pettigrew (USA); United States | 45.26 | Du'aine Ladejo (GBR); Great Britain | 45.44 | Inaldo Sena (BRA); Americas | 45.67 |
| 800 metres | Mark Everett (USA); United States | 1:46.02 | William Tanui (KEN); Africa | 1:46.84 | Craig Winrow (GBR); Great Britain | 1:47.16 |
| 1500 metres | Noureddine Morceli (ALG)} Africa | 3:34.70 | Rüdiger Stenzel (GER); Germany | 3:40.04 | Mohamed Suleiman (QAT); Asia | 3:40.52 |
| 5000 metres | Brahim Lahlafi (MAR); Africa | 13:27.96 | John Nuttall (GBR); Great Britain | 13:32.47 | Martin Bremer (GER); Germany | 13:33.57 |
| 10,000 metres | Khalid Skah (MAR); Africa | 27:38.74 | Antonio Silio (ARG); Americas | 28:16.54 | Robert Denmark (GBR); Great Britain | 28:20.65 |
| 110 metre hurdles | Tony Jarrett (GBR); Great Britain | 13.23 | Allen Johnson (USA); United States | 13.29 | Emilio Valle (CUB); Americas | 13.45 |
| 400 metre hurdles | Samuel Matete (ZAM); Africa | 48.77 | Oleg Tverdokhleb (UKR); Europe | 49.26 | Eronilde de Araújo (BRA); Americas | 49.62 |
| 3000 metre steeplechase | Moses Kiptanui (KEN); Africa | 8:28.28 | Saad Shaddad Al-Asmari (KSA); Asia | 8:35.74 | Alessandro Lambruschini (ITA); Europe | 8:40.34 |
| 4 × 100 metre relay | Great Britain; Darren Braithwaite; Tony Jarrett; John Regis; Linford Christie | 38.46 | Africa; Frank Nwankpa; Emmanuel Tuffour; Oluyemi Kayode; Olapade Adeniken | 38.97 | United States; Mark Witherspoon; Roland McGhee; Marcel Carter; Sam Jefferson | 39.33 |
| 4 × 400 metre relay | Great Britain; David McKenzie; Du'aine Ladejo; Jamie Baulch; Roger Black | 3:01.34 | Africa; Simon Kemboi; Samuel Matete; Samson Kitur; Sunday Bada | 3:02.66 | Europe; Mathias Rusterholz; Stéphane Diagana; Mikhail Vdovin; Dmitriy Golovastov | 3:03.26 |
| High jump | Javier Sotomayor (CUB); Americas | 2.40 | Tim Forsyth (AUS); Oceania | 2.28 | Steve Smith (GBR); Great Britain | 2.28 |
| Pole vault | Okkert Brits (RSA); Africa | 5.90 | Jean Galfione (FRA); Europe | 5.75 | Alberto Manzano (CUB); Americas; Andrei Tivontchik (GER); Germany | 5.40 |
| Long jump | Fred Salle (GBR); Great Britain | 8.10 | Douglas de Souza (BRA); Americas | 7.96 | Dion Bentley (USA); United States | 7.93 |
| Triple jump | Yoelbi Quesada (CUB); Americas | 17.61 | Julian Golley (GBR); Great Britain | 17.06 | Oleg Sakirkin (KAZ); Asia | 16.81 |
| Shot put | C. J. Hunter (USA); United States | 19.92 | Aleksandr Klimenko (UKR); Europe | 19.16 | Courtney Ireland (NZL); Oceania | 18.93 |
| Discus throw | Vladimir Dubrovshchik (BLR); Europe | 64.54 | Alexis Elizalde (CUB); Americas | 61.50 | Adewale Olukoju (NGR); Africa | 60.22 |
| Hammer throw | Andrey Abduvaliyev (TJK); Asia | 81.72 | Lance Deal (USA); United States | 81.14 | Heinz Weis (GER); Germany | 80.32 |
| Javelin throw | Steve Backley (GBR); Great Britain | 85.02 | Raymond Hecht (GER); Germany | 84.36 | Gavin Lovegrove (NZL); Oceania | 82.28 |

=== Women ===
| Event | Gold | | Silver | | Bronze | |
|---|---|---|---|---|---|---|
| 100 metres | Irina Privalova (RUS); Europe | 11.32 | Liliana Allen (CUB); Americas | 11.50 | Mary Onyali (NGR); Africa | 11.52 |
| 200 metres | Merlene Ottey (JAM); Americas | 22.23 | Irina Privalova (RUS); Europe | 22.51 | Cathy Freeman (AUS); Oceania | 22.72 |
| 400 metres | Irina Privalova (RUS); Europe | 50.62 | Fatima Yusuf (NGR); Africa | 50.80 | Jearl Miles (USA); United States | 51.24 |
| 800 metres | Maria Mutola (MOZ); Africa | 1:58.27 | Luciana Mendes (BRA); Americas | 2:00.13 | Natalya Dukhnova (BLR); Europe | 2:02.81 |
| 1500 metres | Hassiba Boulmerka (ALG); Africa | 4:01.05 | Angela Chalmers (CAN); Americas | 4:01.73 | Kelly Holmes (GBR); Great Britain | 4:10.81 |
| 3000 metres | Yvonne Murray (GBR); Great Britain | 8:56.81 | Robyn Meagher (CAN); Americas | 9:05.81 | Gabriela Szabo (ROU); Europe | 9:15.16 |
| 10,000 metres | Elana Meyer (RSA); Africa | 30:52.51 | Fernanda Ribeiro (POR); Europe | 31:04.25 | Wei Li (CHN); Asia | 32:37.94 |
| 100 metre hurdles | Aliuska López (CUB); Americas | 12.91 | Svetla Dimitrova (BUL); Europe | 12.95 | Jacqui Agyepong (GBR); Great Britain | 13.02 |
| 400 metre hurdles | Sally Gunnell (GBR); Great Britain | 54.80 | Silvia Rieger (GER); Germany | 56.14 | Anna Knoroz (RUS); Europe | 56.63 |
| 4 × 100 metre relay | Africa; Faith Idehen; Mary Tombiri; Christy Opara-Thompson; Mary Onyali | 42.92 | Germany; Andrea Philipp; Silke Lichtenhagen; Silke Knoll; Melanie Paschke | 43.22 | Oceania; Monique Miers; Cathy Freeman; Melinda Gainsford; Michelle Seymour | 43.36 |
| 4 × 400 metre relay | Great Britain; Phylis Smith; Linda Keough; Melanie Neef; Sally Gunnell | 3:27.36 | Germany; Karin Janke; Uta Rohländer; Heike Meißner; Anja Rücker | 3:27.59 | Americas; Nancy McLeón; Sandie Richards; Idalmis Bonne; Julia Duporty | 3:27.91 |
| High jump | Britta Bilač (SLO); Europe | 1.91 | Charmaine Weavers (RSA); Africa | 1.91 | Silvia Costa (CUB); Americas | 1.91 |
| Long jump | Inessa Kravets (UKR); Europe | 7.00 | Niurka Montalvo (CUB); Americas | 6.70 | Christy Opara-Thompson (NGR); Africa | 6.66 |
| Triple jump | Anna Biryukova (RUS); Europe | 14.46 | Sheila Hudson-Strudwick (USA); United States | 14.00 | Ren Ruiping (CHN); Asia | 13.84 |
| Shot put | Huang Zhihong (CHN); Asia | 19.45 | Belsy Laza (CUB); Americas | 19.07 | Astrid Kumbernuss (GER); Germany | 18.89 |
| Discus throw | Ilke Wyludda (GER); Germany | 65.30 | Ellina Zvereva (BLR); Europe | 63.86 | Daniela Costian (AUS); Oceania | 63.38 |
| Javelin throw | Trine Hattestad (NOR); Europe | 66.48 | Isel López (CUB); Americas | 61.40 | Karen Forkel (GER); Germany | 61.26 |
