= Bikila =

Bikila (Amharic: ቢቂላ) is a male name of Ethiopian origin that may refer to:

- Abebe Bikila (1932–1973), Ethiopian marathon runner and two-time Olympic champion
- Worku Bikila (born 1968), Ethiopian 5000 metres runner
