= Athletics at the 2000 Summer Olympics – Men's 10,000 metres =

Men's 10,000 metres at the Games of the XXVII Olympiad
- Venue: Stadium Australia
- Dates: 22 September (heats); 25 September (final)
- Competitors: 34 from 19 nations
- Winning time: 27:18.20

Medalists
1st place, gold medalist(s)		Haile Gebrselassie; Ethiopia
2nd place, silver medalist(s)		Paul Tergat; Kenya
3rd place, bronze medalist(s)		Assefa Mezgebu; Ethiopia

Official Video Highlights @ 1:02

Complete race

The 10,000 metres at the 2000 Summer Olympics as part of the athletics programme were held at Stadium Australia on Friday 22 September, and Monday 25 September 2000. The winning margin was 0.09 seconds.

Without Haile Gebrselassie, Paul Tergat would have won everything since the previous Olympics. He was the silver medalist in the previous Olympics and the ensuing two world championships. He was the World Cross Country Champion five times in a row in Gebrselassie's absence. The final broke down to a team race, with three Kenyans vs Ethiopians Gebrselassie and Assefa Mezgebu. With a lap to go, John Korir held the lead marked by Gebrselassie, with Tergat marking him. Mezgebu moved from behind Tergat to Gebrselassie's shoulder, boxing Tergat along the rail through the penultimate turn. Down the backstretch, Tergat slowed down a step to get out of the box, then sprinting around the outside, past everyone. The sprint was on. Unlike previous finals, Tergat had the drop on Gebrselassie, making Geb chase, with only Mezgebu able to hold on behind. Down the homestretch both were in full sprint, Tergat ahead, Gebrselassie making progress but not advancing enough to pass. Gebrselassie continued to press, drawing even with less than ten metres to go. Tergat strained, his last several steps losing his balance while Gebrselassie held form to take the gold again.

== Records ==
World and Olympic records prior to the Games
World Record	26:22.75	Haile Gebrselassie	Ethiopia	Hengelo, Netherlands	1 June 1998
Olympic Record	27:07.34	Haile Gebrselassie	Ethiopia	Atlanta, United States	29 July 1996

== Medalists ==
Gold:	Silver:	Bronze:
Haile Gebrselassie, Ethiopia	Paul Tergat, Kenya	Assefa Mezgebu, Ethiopia

== Results ==
All times shown are in seconds.

- Q denotes qualification by place in heat.
- q denotes qualification by overall place.
- DNS denotes did not start.
- DNF denotes did not finish.
- DQ denotes disqualification.
- NR denotes national record.
- OR denotes Olympic record.
- WR denotes world record.
- PB denotes personal best.
- SB denotes season best.

== Qualifying heats ==
The top eight runners in each of the initial two heats automatically qualified for the final. The next four fastest runners from across the heats also qualified. There were a total number of 34 participating athletes.

Heat 1 of 2 Date: Friday 22 September 2000
Place		Athlete	Nation	Order	Time	Qual.	Record
Heat	Overall	Athlete	Nation	Order	Time	Qual.	Record
1	8	Haile Gebrselassie	Ethiopia	2	27:50.01	Q	
2	10	Patrick Ivuti	Kenya	15	27:50.10	Q	
3	11	John Korir	Kenya	7	27:50.19	Q	
4	12	Assefa Mezgebu	Ethiopia	8	27:50.64	Q	
5	16	Toshinari Takaoka	Japan	3	27:59.95	Q	SB
6	19	Samir Moussaoui	Algeria	4	28:08.22	Q	
7	21	Abdihakim Abdirahman	United States	9	28:09.04	Q	
8	22	Enrique Molina	Spain	5	28:09.76	Q	
9	23	Andres Jones	Great Britain	13	28:11.20		
10	24	Armando Quintanilla	Mexico	11	28:14.54		
11	25	Sisay Bezabeh	Australia	10	28:21.63		
12	27	Sean Kaley	Canada	16	28:36.07		
13	28	Robert Denmark	Great Britain	1	28:43.74		
14	29	Shaun Creighton	Australia	12	28:52.71		
15	32	Daniele Caimmi	Italy	17	29:01.26		
16	33	Teodoro Cuñado	Spain	14	29:10.90		
17	34	Michael Aish	New Zealand	6	29:31.83		

Heat 2 of 2 Date: Friday 22 September 2000
Place		Athlete	Nation	Order	Time	Qual.	Record
Heat	Overall	Athlete	Nation	Order	Time	Qual.	Record
1	1	Girma Tolla	Ethiopia	7	27:44.01	Q	
2	2	Paul Tergat	Kenya	10	27:44.07	Q	
3	3	Katsuhiko Hanada	Japan	9	27:45.13	Q	PB
4	4	Mohammed Mourhit	Belgium	8	27:45.73	Q	
5	5	Said Berioui	Morocco	11	27:45.83	Q	
6	6	Karl Keska	Great Britain	8	27:48:29	Q	PB
7	7	David Galván	Mexico	12	27:49.53	Q	
8	9	Aloys Nizigama	Burundi	2	27:50.09	Q	SB
9	13	José Rios	Spain	6	27:51.40	q	
10	14	José Ramos	Portugal	13	27:56.30	q	PB
11	15	Mebrahtom Keflezighi	United States	15	27:58.96	q	
12	17	Rachid Berradi	Italy	1	28:01.18	q	
13	18	Mauricio Díaz	Chile	4	28:05.61		NR
14	20	Yonas Kifle	Eritrea	5	28:08.59		NR
15	26	Jeff Schiebler	Canada	3	28:30.46		
16	30	Dmitry Maksimov	Russia	14	28:54.15		
17	31	Alan Culpepper	United States	16	29:00.71		

Overall Results Semi-Finals

Semi-Finals Overall Results
Place	Athlete	Nation	Heat	Order	Place	Time	Qual.	Record
1	Girma Tolla	Ethiopia	2	7	1	27:44.01	Q	
2	Paul Tergat	Kenya	2	10	2	27:44.07	Q	
3	Katsuhiko Hanada	Japan	2	9	3	27:45.13	Q	PB
4	Mohammed Mourhit	Belgium	2	17	4	27:45.73	Q	
5	Said Berioui	Morocco	2	11	5	27:45.83	Q	
6	Karl Keska	Great Britain	2	8	6	27:48:29	Q	PB
7	David Galván	Mexico	2	12	7	27:49.53	Q	
8	Haile Gebrselassie	Ethiopia	1	2	1	27:50.01	Q	
9	Aloys Nizigama	Burundi	2	2	8	27:50.09	Q	SB
10	Patrick Ivuti	Kenya	1	15	2	27:50.10	Q	
11	John Korir	Kenya	1	7	3	27:50.19	Q	
12	Assefa Mezgebu	Ethiopia	1	8	4	27:50.64	Q	
13	José Rios	Spain	2	6	9	27:51.40	q	
14	José Ramos	Portugal	2	13	10	27:56.30	q	PB
15	Mebrahtom Keflezighi	United States	2	15	11	27:58.96	q	
16	Toshinari Takaoka	Japan	1	3	6	27:59.95	Q	SB
17	Rachid Berradi	Italy	2	1	12	28:01.18	q	
18	Mauricio Díaz	Chile	2	4	13	28:05.61		NR
19	Samir Moussaoui	Algeria	1	4	6	28:08.22	Q	
20	Yonas Kifle	Eritrea	2	5	14	28:08.59		NR
21	Abdihakim Abdirahman	United States	1	9	7	28:09.04	Q	
22	Enrique Molina	Spain	1	5	8	28:09.76	Q	
23	Andres Jones	Great Britain	1	13	9	28:11.20		
24	Armando Quintanilla	Mexico	1	11	10	28:14.54		
25	Sisay Bezabeh	Australia	1	10	11	28:21.63		
26	Jeff Schiebler	Canada	2	3	15	28:30.46		
27	Sean Kaley	Canada	1	16	12	28:36.07		
28	Robert Denmark	Great Britain	1	1	13	28:43.74		
29	Shaun Creighton	Australia	1	12	14	28:52.71		
30	Dmitry Maksimov	Russia	2	14	16	28:54.15		
31	Alan Culpepper	United States	2	16	17	29:00.71		
32	Daniele Caimmi	Italy	1	17	15	29:01.26		
33	Teodoro Cunado	Spain	1	14	16	29:10.90		
34	Michael Aish	New Zealand	1	6	17	29:31.83		

== Final ==
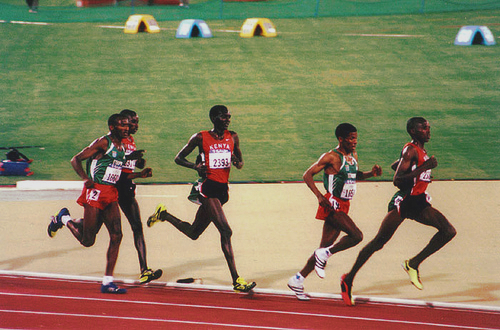
Competition underway

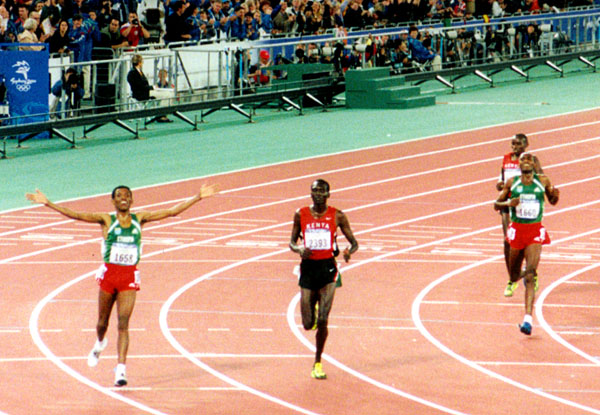
Athletes after crossing the finish line

Final Date: Monday 25 September 2000 Time:
Place	Athlete	Nation	Order	Time	Record
1	Haile Gebrselassie	Ethiopia	19	27:18.20	SB
2	Paul Tergat	Kenya	8	27:18.29	
3	Assefa Mezgebu	Ethiopia	2	27:19.75	SB
4	Patrick Ivuti	Kenya	16	27:20.44	
5	John Korir	Kenya	20	27:24.75	PB
6	Said Berioui	Morocco	7	27:37.83	SB
7	Toshinari Takaoka	Japan	9	27:40.44	PB
8	Karl Keska	Great Britain	6	27:44.09	PB
9	Aloys Nizigama	Burundi	12	27:44.56	SB
10	Abdihakim Abdirahman	United States	18	27:46.17	PB
11	Girma Tolla	Ethiopia	15	27:49.75	
12	Mebrahtom Keflezighi	United States	13	27:53.63	PB
13	David Galvan	Mexico	11	27:54.56	
14	Jose Ramos	Portugal	4	28:07.43	
15	Katsuhiko Hanada	Japan	17	28:08.11	
16	Samir Moussaoui	Algeria	3	28:17.25	
17	Rachid Berradi	Italy	10	28:45.96	
18	Jose Rios	Spain	1	28:50.31	
-	Enrique Molina	Spain	14	DNF	
-	Mohammed Mourhit	Belgium	5	DNF	
