= Athletics at the 2002 Commonwealth Games – Men's 5000 metres =

Men's 5000 metres at the Commonwealth Games

The men's 5000 metres event at the 2002 Commonwealth Games was held on 31 July.

== Results ==
Rank	Name	Nationality	Time	Notes
1st place, gold medalist(s)	Sammy Kipketer	Kenya	13:13.51	GR
2nd place, silver medalist(s)	Benjamin Limo	Kenya	13:13.57	
3rd place, bronze medalist(s)	William Kirui	Kenya	13:18.02	PB
4	John Mayock	England	13:19.43	PB
5	Sam Haughian	England	13:19.45	PB
6	Craig Mottram	Australia	13:25.21	
7	Sean Kaley	Canada	13:26.28	SB
8	Michael Power	Australia	13:34.04	SB
9	Paul Wakou	Uganda	13:37.95	NR
10	Obed Mutanya	Zambia	13:39.74	SB
11	Matt O'Dowd	England	13:43.33	SB
12	Michael Aish	New Zealand	13:45.87	
13	Jeff Schiebler	Canada	13:49.02	
14	Glen Stewart	Scotland	13:49.70	
15	Donald Naylor	Wales	14:09.38	
16	Tau Khotso	Lesotho	14:21.94	
17	Rashid Taimu	Malawi	14:27.94	PB
	Henry Foufaka	Solomon Islands	DNS	
	Andres Jones	Wales	DNS	
	Rodwell Kamwendo	Malawi	DNS	
	John Yuda	Tanzania	DNS	
