= Sean Kaley =

Canadian long-distance runner

Personal information
- Born: 26 February 1975 (age 51) Montreal, Quebec, Canada
- Education: University of Arkansas

Sport
- Sport: Track and field
- Event: Long-distance running
- College team: Arkansas Razorbacks
- Club: Ottawa Lions

Sean Kaley (born 26 February 1975) is a Canadian long-distance runner and psychiatrist. He won the Canadian national championships at 10,000 metres in 1999, and at 5,000 metres in 2000, 2002 and 2003.

Kaley was born in Montreal, Quebec. He attended Brookfield High School in Ottawa, Ontario. He started running as a small child and was a member of the Ottawa Lions Track and Field Club. He was Canadian junior champion at 5,000 and 1,500 metres.

Kaley studied microbiology at the University of Arkansas. While there, he was a All-American athlete for the Arkansas Razorbacks Track and Field team, medalling at the NCAA indoor championships at 3,000 and 5,000 metres, and recording top-five finishes at the 1998 NCAA Division I Cross Country Championships and 1999 World University Games. In the men's short race at the 1999 World Cross Country Championships, Kaley finished 29th.

Kaley competed in the 10,000 metres at the 1999 World Athletics Championships, finishing 26th, and the 2000 Summer Olympics, finishing 27th. He also competed in both the 5,000 metres and 10,000 metres at the 2002 Commonwealth Games, finishing seventh in both events.

After attending the, Kaley remained in Arkansas and became a practicing psychiatrist.
