= Roberto García (runner) =

Spanish long-distance runner

Personal information
- Born: 20 August 1975 (age 51) Fuendejalón, Spain

Sport
- Sport: Long-distance running
Medal record
Representing Spain
Summer Universiade
Silver medal – second place	1999 Palma de Mallorca	5000 m

Roberto García Garcia (born 20 August 1975) is a retired Spanish athlete who competed mostly in the 5000 metres. He finished fourth at the 2002 European Championships in Munich.

== Competition record ==
Year	Competition	Venue	Position	Event	Notes
Representing Spain
1997	European U23 Championships	Turku, Finland	—	10,000m	DNF
1999	Universiade	Palma de Mallorca, Spain	2nd	5000 m	13:38.59
2002	European Championships	Munich, Germany	4th	5000 m	13:40.85
2004	Olympic Games	Athens, Greece	19th (h)	5000 m	13:27.71
2005	Mediterranean Games	Almería, Spain	5th	5000 m	13:33.25
2005	World Championships	Helsinki, Finland	28th (h)	5000 m	13:59.50

== Personal bests ==
Outdoor

- 1500 metres – 3:38.34 (Huelva 2005)
- 3000 metres – 7:39.97 (San Sebastián 2002)
- Two miles – 8:40.13 (Linz 2005)
- 5000 metres – 13:16.13 (San Sebastián 2004)

Indoor

- 1500 metres – 3:45.69 (Valencia 2001)
- 3000 metres – 7:43.59 (Seville 2001)
