= 2002 European Athletics Championships – Men's 5000 metres =

Men's 5000 metres at the European Athletics Championships

The men's 5000 metres at the 2002 European Athletics Championships were held at the Olympic Stadium on August 11.

== Results ==
Rank	Name	Nationality	Time	Notes
1st place, gold medalist(s)	Alberto García	Spain	13:38.18	
2nd place, silver medalist(s)	Ismaïl Sghyr	France	13:39.81	
3rd place, bronze medalist(s)	Serhiy Lebid	Ukraine	13:40.00	
4	Roberto García	Spain	13:40.85	
5	Kamiel Maase	Netherlands	13:41.42	
6	Mark Carroll	Ireland	13:42.87	
7	Balázs Csillag	Hungary	13:49.03	
8	Salvatore Vincenti	Italy	13:50.53	
9	Sam Haughian	Great Britain	13:50.75	
10	Michele Gamba	Italy	13:53.28	
11	Jesús España	Spain	13:55.80	
12	Christian Belz	Switzerland	13:56.69	
13	Tom Compernolle	Belgium	13:57.46	
14	Marius Bakken	Norway	13:57.89	
15	Erik Sjöqvist	Sweden	13:57.96	
16	Rachid Chékhémani	France	13:59.75	
17	Mikhail Yeginov	Russia	14:05.45	
18	Gennaro Di Napoli	Italy	14:08.19	
19	Michael May	Germany	14:12.01	
20	Dalibor Balgae	Croatia	14:14.55	
21	Joakim Johansson	Sweden	14:22.98	
	Hassan Lahssini	France	DNF	
