= 1994 European Athletics Championships – Men's 5000 metres =

Men's 5000 metres at the European Athletics Championships

These are the official results of the Men's 5,000 metres event at the 1994 European Championships in Helsinki, Finland, held at Helsinki Olympic Stadium on 11 and 14 August 1994.

== Medalists ==
Gold	Dieter Baumann; Germany
Silver	Rob Denmark; United Kingdom
Bronze	Abel Antón; Spain

== Final ==
Rank	Final	Time
	Dieter Baumann (GER)	13:36.93
	Rob Denmark (GBR)	13:37.50
	Abel Antón (ESP)	13:38.04
4.	Abdellah Béhar (FRA)	13:38.36
5.	John Nuttall (GBR)	13:38.65
6.	José Carlos Adán (ESP)	13:39.16
7.	Risto Ulmala (FIN)	13:40.84
8.	Anacleto Jiménez (ESP)	13:41.60
9.	Domingos Castro (POR)	13:42.09
10.	Stéphane Franke (GER)	13:45.67
11.	Paolo Donati (ITA)	13:47.34
12.	Vener Kashayev (RUS)	13:53.66
13.	Frank O'Mara (IRL)	13:58.75
14.	José Ramos (POR)	14:04.33
15.	Mohamed Ezzher (FRA)	14:14.73

== Heats ==
Rank	Heat 1	Time
1.	Abdellah Béhar (FRA)	13:39.77
2.	Dieter Baumann (GER)	13:39.97
3.	Rob Denmark (GBR)	13:40.10
4.	Anacleto Jiménez (ESP)	13:40.25
5.	José Carlos Adán (ESP)	13:40.39
6.	João Junqueira (POR)	13:40.59
7.	Umberto Pusterla (ITA)	13:41.64
8.	Zoltán Káldy (HUN)	13:45.70
9.	Noel Berkeley (IRL)	13:54.35
—	Jan Pešava (CZE)	DNS
—	Róbert Štefko (SVK)	DNS

Rank	Heat 2	Time
1.	José Ramos (POR)	13:30.33
2.	Domingos Castro (POR)	13:30.68
3.	John Nuttall (GBR)	13:30.78
4.	Risto Ulmala (FIN)	13:30.94
5.	Mohamed Ezzher (FRA)	13:31.52
6.	Vener Kashayev (RUS)	13:31.93
7.	Frank O'Mara (IRL)	13:33.13
8.	Stéphane Franke (GER)	13:33.63
9.	Paolo Donati (ITA)	13:34.54
10.	Abel Antón (ESP)	13:34.62
11.	Zeki Öztürk (TUR)	13:45.62
12.	Sławomir Kąpiński (POL)	14:13.90

== Participation ==
According to an unofficial count, 21 athletes from 12 countries participated in the event.

- Finland (1)
- France (2)
- Germany (2)
- Hungary (1)
- Ireland (2)
- Italy (2)
- Poland (1)
- Portugal (3)
- Russia (1)
- Spain (3)
- Turkey (1)
- United Kingdom (2)

== See also ==
- 1992 Men's Olympic 5,000 metres (Barcelona)
- 1993 Men's World Championships 5,000 metres (Stuttgart)
- 1995 Men's World Championships 5,000 metres (Gothenburg)
- 1996 Men's Olympic 5,000 metres (Atlanta)
