= José Ramos (runner) =

Portuguese long-distance runner

José Joaquim Domingos Ramos (born 28 July 1968 in Gateira) is a Portuguese long-distance runner.

== Achievements ==
| Year | Competition | Venue | Position | Event | Notes |
Representing Portugal
| 1992 | Ibero-American Championships | Seville, Spain | 7th | 5000m | 14:09.84 |
| 1994 | European Championships | Helsinki, Finland | 14th | 5000 m | 14:04.33 |
| 1995 | World Championships | Gothenburg, Sweden | — | 5000 m | DNF |
| 1996 | Olympic Games | Atlanta, United States | 15th (sf) | 5000 m | DNF |
| 1997 | World Championships | Athens, Greece | 18th | 10,000 m | 29:49.00 |
| 2000 | Ibero-American Championships | Rio de Janeiro, Brazil | 1st | 5000 m | 13:43.86 |
| 2000 | Olympic Games | Sydney, Australia | 14th | 10,000 m | 28:07.43 |
| 2001 | World Championships | Edmonton, Canada | — | 10,000 m | DNF |
| 2006 | European Championships | Gothenburg, Sweden | 12th | 10,000 m | 28:55.45 |
