= 1998 European Athletics Championships – Men's 5000 metres =

Men's 5000 metres at the European Athletics Championships

The men's 5000 metres at the 1998 European Athletics Championships was held at the Népstadion on 22 August.

== Medalists ==
Gold	Isaac Viciosa; Spain
Silver	Manuel Pancorbo; Spain
Bronze	Mark Carroll; Ireland

== Results ==
KEY:	q	Fastest non-qualifiers	Q	Qualified	NR	National record	PB	Personal best	SB	Seasonal best

=== Final ===
Rank	Name	Nationality	Time	Notes
1st place, gold medalist(s)	Isaac Viciosa	Spain	13:37.46	
2nd place, silver medalist(s)	Manuel Pancorbo	Spain	13:38.03	
3rd place, bronze medalist(s)	Mark Carroll	Ireland	13:38.15	
4	Mustapha Essaïd	France	13:39.85	
5	Abdellah Béhar	France	13:40.26	
6	Samuli Vasala	Finland	13:40.68	
7	Driss El Himer	France	13:41.36	
8	Miroslav Vanko	Slovakia	13:41.92	SB
9	Karl Keska	Great Britain	13:42.58	
10	Alberto García	Spain	13:45.58	
11	Simone Zanon	Italy	13:46.88	
12	Kent Claesson	Sweden	13:49.55	
13	Dieter Baumann	Germany	13:50.91	
14	Metin Sazak	Turkey	13:51.70	
15	Serhiy Lebid	Ukraine	13:55.52	
16	Eduardo Henriques	Portugal	13:59.50	
17	Rodney Finch	Great Britain	14:09.87	
18	Christos Papapetrou	Cyprus	14:36.39	
