= Athletics at the 1999 Summer Universiade – Men's 5000 metres =

The men's 5000 metres event at the 1999 Summer Universiade was held on 10 July at the Estadio Son Moix in Palma de Mallorca, Spain.

== Results ==
Rank	Athlete	Nationality	Time	Notes
1st place, gold medalist(s)	Serhiy Lebid	Ukraine	13:37.52	UR
2nd place, silver medalist(s)	Roberto García	Spain	13:38.59	
3rd place, bronze medalist(s)	Naoki Mishiro	Japan	13:39.10	PB
4	Matt O'Dowd	Great Britain	13:40.54	PB
5	Sean Kaley	Canada	13:41.67	
6	Koichiro Nagata	Japan	13:42.08	PB
7	Marco Mazza	Italy	13:42.37	
8	Jonathon Riley	United States	13:50.08	
9	Raymond Appenheimer	United States	13:50.08	
10	Abderrahim Maarouf	Morocco	13:51.64	PB
11	Kris Bowditch	Great Britain	13:52.27	
12	Igor Murga	Spain	13:57.51	
13	Hu An	China	14:17.13	
14	Ahmed Natli	Algeria	14:28.14	SB
15	Şeref Ali Imamoğlu	Turkey	14:28.14	
16	Osman Tayeb	Qatar	14:29.58	
17	Ulrik Bohnsen	Denmark	14:35.54	
18	Francisco Gómez Vega	Costa Rica	14:53.93	PB
19	Ibrahim Abba Gombo	Chad	15:45.32	PB
	Mohamed Abdelnabi	Sudan	DNF	
	Janko Benša	Yugoslavia	DNF	
	Manuel Médez	Argentina	DNS	
	David Muturi Kariuki	Kenya	DNS	
	Sammy Nyamongo	Kenya	DNS	
