= Bruno Toledo (runner) =

Spanish retired long-distance runner (born 1973)

Bruno Toledo (born 23 November 1973) is a Spanish retired long-distance runner who specialised in the 10,000-metre run.

== Achievements ==
| Year | Competition | Venue | Position | Event | Notes |
Representing Spain
| 1992 | World Junior Championships | Seoul, South Korea | 9th | 10,000m | 29:52.28 |
| 1998 | World Cross Country Championships | Marrakesh, Morocco | 23rd | Long race (12 km) | 35:34 |
| 1998 | World Cross Country Championships | Marrakesh, Morocco | 5th | Team competition | 94 pts |
| 1998 | European Championships | Budapest, Hungary | 5th | 10,000 m | 28:15.17 |
| 1999 | World Championships | Seville, Spain | 25th | 10,000 m | 29:39.28 |

=== Personal bests ===
- 1500 metres – 3:38.7 min (1998)
- 3000 metres – 7:44.17 min (1998)
- 5000 metres – 13:25.40 min (1998)
- 10,000 metres – 27:43.29 min (1998)
