= Teodoro Cuñado =

Spanish long-distance runner

Personal information
- Nationality: Spanish
- Born: 13 February 1970 (age 56)

Sport
- Sport: Long-distance running
- Event: 10,000 metres

Teodoro Cuñado (born 13 February 1970) is a Spanish long-distance runner. He competed in the men's 10,000 metres at the 2000 Summer Olympics.
