= Paul Koech =

Kenyan long-distance runner (1969–2018)

Personal information
- Nationality: Kenyan
- Born: 25 June 1969
- Died: 3 September 2018 (aged 49)
- Occupation: Marathon runner
Medal record
Men's athletics
Representing Kenya
African Championships
| Gold medal – first place | 1996 Yaoundé | 5000 m |

Paul Koech (25 June 1969 – 3 September 2018) was a Kenyan distance and marathon runner. He participated at the IAAF World Half Marathon Championships in 1998 and finished in first place. He was also a regular competitor in the IAAF World Cross Country Championships with several top-5 positions.

He won the Parelloop 10K race in the Netherlands in 1999.

== Personal life and death ==
Koech was an uncle of Sally Barsosio. He lived in Burnt Forest, Uasin Gishu District, Kenya.

He was married to Zipporah and had six children.

Koech died on 3 September 2018 at the age of 48.

Sporting positions
| Preceded by Simon Lopuyet | Men's Half Marathon Best Year Performance; 1996 | Succeeded by Shem Kororia |
