= Aïssa Belaout =

Algerian runner (born 1968)

Aïssa Belaout (born 12 August 1968) is an Algerian runner who specialized in the 5000 metres.

He finished fifteenth in this event at the 1996 Summer Olympics and won a silver medal at the 1993 Mediterranean Games. He also reached the final at the 1993 World Championships, but failed to finish the race.

== Personal bests ==
- 800 metres - 1:52.94 min (2006)
- 1500 metres - 3:38.64 min (1993)
- 3000 metres - 7:38.70 min (1993)
- 5000 metres - 13:08.03 min (1993)
