= Andres Jones =

British long-distance runner

Personal information
- Nationality: British (Welsh)
- Born: 3 February 1977 (age 49) Aberystwyth, Wales
- Height: 183 cm (6 ft 0 in)
- Weight: 60 kg (132 lb)

Sport
- Sport: Athletics
- Event: Long-distance running
- Club: Cardiff AAC

Tomas Andres Jones (born 3 February 1977) is a British former long-distance runner who competed at the 2000 Summer Olympics.

== Biography ==
Jones is from Aberaeron, where a local police constable spotted his talent and coached him. He eventually commuted to train in Cardiff.

At the 2000 Olympic Games in Sydney, he represented Great Britain in the men's 10,000 metres.

Jones became both the British 5000 metres champion and British 10,000 metres champion after winning the British AAA Championships titles at the 2000 AAA Championships. In the 10,000 metres he was classified British champion by being the highest placed British athlete and his winning time was the fourth-fastest ever by a Welshman, behind Steve Jones, Tony Simmons, and Ian Hamer

Though the 2000 Olympics was Jones' first senior international appearance, he went on to compete at the 2001 European Cross Country Championships and the 2002 Commonwealth Games.
