= Julian Paynter =

Australian long-distance runner

Personal information
- Born: 15 July 1970 (age 56) Edinburgh, Great Britain

Sport
- Sport: Long-distance running

Julian Paynter (born 15 July 1970) is a retired long-distance runner, who represented Australia at the 1996 Summer Olympics in Atlanta, Georgia. There he was eliminated in the semi-finals of the men's 5,000 metres competition. He set his personal best (13:24.22) in the men's 5,000 metres on 19 November 1995 in Melbourne, Australia. Julian's second oldest child also has much potential in his athletic ability. After his athletics career he started participating in top level cycling races in Australia, like the historic Melbourne to Warrnambool Classic.
