= Paul Bitok =

Kenyan long-distance runner

Medal record

Men's athletics

Representing Kenya

Olympic Games
Silver medal – second place	1992 Barcelona	5000 m
Silver medal – second place	1996 Atlanta	5000 m

African Championships
Gold medal – first place	2002 Radès	5000 m

Paul Bitok (born 26 June 1970 in Kilibwoni, Nandi) is a Kenyan long-distance runner, who won two silver medals at consecutive Summer Olympics (1992, 1996) over 5000 metres.

== Life ==
Bitok emerged in 1992 as a relatively unknown athlete. He qualified for the Barcelona Games at the Kenyan trials and defeated several world class athletes at the Bislett Games in Oslo. By the time of the Olympics he had established himself as one of the favourites. He narrowly lost the final to Dieter Baumann of Germany. A few weeks later he won the 5000 m race in Zurich. In the following years Bitok did not match his performances of 1992. However, by 1996 he was back and won another silver in Atlanta. He also won two World Indoor silvers (1997, 1999) in the 3000 metres behind Haile Gebrselassie.

He is married to Pauline Konga, who won the silver medal in women's 5000 metres at the 1996 Olympics, becoming the first Kenyan female Olympic medalist.
