= Enrique Molina (runner) =

Spanish athletics competitor

Medal record

Men's athletics

Representing Spain

World Indoor Championships
| Bronze medal – third place | 1993 Toronto | 3000 m |

Enrique Molina Vargas (Note: In this Spanish name, the first or paternal surname is Molina and the second or maternal family name is Vargas.) (born 25 February 1968) is a retired Spanish runner who specialized in the 5000 metres.

He was born in La Zubia. He won the bronze medal in 3000 metres at the 1993 World Indoor Championships, finished seventh in the 5000 metres at the 1996 Olympic Games, eighth in the 5000 metres at the 1997 World Championships and fourteenth in the 10,000 metres at the 1999 World Championships. He also competed at the 1992 European Indoor Championships, the 1995 World Championships, the 2000 Olympic Games and the 2001 World Championships without reaching the final. He became Spanish 5000 metres champion in 1995, and indoor 1500 metres champion in 1993.

In cross-country running he finished twenty-fourth in the long race at the 1999 World Cross Country Championships and seventeenth at the 2000 World Cross Country Championships. In the team competition Spain finished fourth in 1999 and repeated this in 2000. Molina became Spanish cross-country champion in 2000.

His personal best times were 3:38.51 minutes in the 1500 metres, achieved in August 1997 in Zürich; 7:32.32 minutes in the 3000 metres, achieved in July 1997 in Oslo; 13:07.34 minutes in the 5000 metres, achieved in July 1997 in Stockholm; and 27:49.71 minutes in the 10,000 metres, achieved in April 1998 in Lisbon.
