= Abdellah Béhar =

French athlete

Abdellah Béhar (born 5 July 1963 in Souk Arba du Gharb) is a retired Moroccan-born French runner who specializes in the 5000 metres and cross-country running.

== Achievements ==
| Year | Competition | Venue | Position | Event | Notes |
Representing France
| 1994 | European Championships | Helsinki, Finland | 4th | 5000 m | 13:38.36 |
| 1995 | World Championships | Gothenburg, Sweden | 15th | 5000 m | 14:19.04 |
| 1997 | World Championships | Athens, Greece | 11th | 5000 m | 13:29.10 |
| 1998 | European Championships | Budapest, Hungary | 5th | 5000 m | 13:40.26 |
| 1999 | World Cross Country Championships | Belfast, Northern Ireland | 7th | Short race (4.236 km) | 12:44 |
| 1999 | World Half Marathon Championships | Palermo, Italy | 4th | Half Marathon | 1:01:53 |
| 2000 | World Cross Country Championships | Vilamoura, Portugal | 9th | Long race (12.3 km) | 35:55 |
| 2000 | Paris Marathon | Paris, France | 3rd | Marathon | 2:09:13 |
| 2000 | Olympic Games | Sydney, Australia | — | Marathon | DNF |
| 2000 | Lille Half Marathon | Lille, France | 1st | Half Marathon | 1:01:30 |
| 2000 | Fukuoka Marathon | Fukuoka, Japan | 3rd | Marathon | 2:09:09 |
| 2001 | Rotterdam Marathon | Rotterdam, Netherlands | 4th | Marathon | 2:09.05 |
| 2001 | World Championships | Edmonton, Canada | 66th | Marathon | 2:41:42 |
| 2002 | Paris Marathon | Paris, France | 7th | Marathon | 2:10:06 |

=== Personal bests ===
- 3000 metres - 7:35.80 min (1996)
- 5000 metres - 13:13.33 min (1998)
- 10,000 metres - 27:42.57 min (1996)
- Half marathon - 1:01:30 hrs (2000)
- Marathon - 2:09:05 hrs (2001)
