= Miroslav Vanko =

Slovak long-distance runner

Personal information
- Nationality: Slovak
- Born: 14 February 1973 (age 53)

Sport
- Sport: Long-distance running
- Event: 5000 metres

Miroslav Vanko (born 14 February 1973) is a retired Slovak long-distance runner. He competed in the men's 5000 metres and the 10,000 metres at the 1996 Summer Olympics. In both events Vanko failed to qualify for the finals.

He has held national records for the indoor 3000 meters (7:54.59) and indoor 5000 meters (13:54.39) for over 2 decades. Vanko set his half marathon P.R. at the Venloop road race in the Netherlands with a time of 1:04.40 in 2007.
