= Phillimon Hanneck =

Zimbabwean long-distance runner

Phillimon Hanneck (born 12 May 1971 in Salisbury, Rhodesia – now Harare, Zimbabwe) is a long-distance runner who specialized in the 5000 metres. He originally represented Zimbabwe changed nationality in 1999 to the United States. He won a silver medal at the 1994 Commonwealth Games in Victoria, and finished tenth in at the 1995 World Championships in Athletics in Gothenburg. His personal best time was 13:14.50 minutes, achieved in June 1994 in Rome.

He is the course record holder at the Manchester Road Race, in Manchester, CT. He won the race in 1994 and 1995, setting the course record in 1995 with a time of 21:19 on the 4.748 mile (7.641 km) course. He also holds the course records for the BOclassic 10K race in Bolzano, Italy, having won with a time of 28:02.1 in 1991, and the Marin Marin Memorial Day Races 10k, held in Kentfield California, USA, with a time of 28:45 in 1994. Hanneck was the 1993 winner of the Emsley Carr Mile. He holds the event record of the Gasparilla Distance Classic's 15k road race held in Tampa, Florida, USA. On Feb. 26, 1994, Hanneck set that mark at Gasparilla with his time of 42:35. Phillimon was actually educated at Allan Wilson Boys High school. Graduated at The University of Texas with a degree BBA in Management.

Hanneck has a 17-year-old daughter. He set a world record in a road mile in 3 minutes and 46 seconds in Tulsa. Hanneck has 5 Zimbabwean records 1500m 3:35, 3000m 7:42, mile 3:53, 5000m 13:14 and 15 km 42 mins and 35 seconds.

== International competitions ==
Year	Competition	Venue	Position	Event	Notes
Representing Zimbabwe
1992	Summer Olympics	Barcelona, Spain	10th (semis)	1500 m	
1993	World Championships	Stuttgart, Germany	8th (heats)	5000 m	
1994	Commonwealth Games	Victoria, British Columbia, Canada	2nd	5000 m	
1995	World Championships	Gothenburg, Sweden	10th	5000 m	
