= Shem Kororia =

Kenyan long-distance runner

Medal record

Men's Athletics

Representing Kenya

World Championships
| Bronze medal – third place | 1995 Gothenburg | 5000 m |

Shem Kororia (born 25 September 1972) is a former Kenyan long-distance runner who specialized in the 5000 metres and half marathon. He represented his native country at the 1996 Summer Olympics in Atlanta, United States. Kororia was the third man ever to run the half marathon within an hour, when he won the world half marathon title in October 1997 in Košice, Slovakia, clocking 59:56 minutes.

He won 5000 metres gold twice at the Military World Games: in 1995 and 1999. He also won the Parelloop 10K in race in the Netherlands in 1997 and had back-to-back wins at the BOclassic in 1994–95.

He also competed in cross country running events. He was twice a team gold medallist with Kenya at the IAAF World Cross Country Championships (1994 and 1997). On the major cross country meet circuit he had two wins at the Cross Internacional de la Constitución (1994 and 1995) and was the 1996 winner of both the Campaccio and the Cross Internacional de Venta de Baños races.

He is from Kaptama in Mount Elgon District, the same village as Edith Masai.

== International competitions ==
| Year | Competition | Venue | Position | Notes |
|---|---|---|---|---|
| 1995 | World Championships | Gothenburg, Sweden | 3rd | 5000 m |
| 1995 | Military World Games | Rome, Italy | 1st | 5000 m |
| 1997 | World Half Marathon Championships | Košice, Slovakia | 1st | Half marathon |
| 1998 | World Half Marathon Championships | Uster, Switzerland | 10th | Half marathon |
| 1999 | Military World Games | Zagreb, Croatia | 1st | 5000 m |

== Personal bests ==
- 3000 metres - 7:36.53 min (1995)
- 5000 metres - 13:02.80 min (1995)
- 10,000 metres - 27:18.02 min (1995)
- Half marathon - 59:56 min (1997)
- Marathon - 2:09:32 hrs (1999)

Sporting positions
| Preceded by Paul Koech | Men's Half Marathon Best Year Performance; 1997 | Succeeded by Paul Tergat |
