= Cormac Finnerty =

Irish long-distance runner

Personal information
- Nationality: Irish
- Born: 14 January 1970 (age 56)
- Height: 178 cm (5 ft 10 in)
- Weight: 66 kg (146 lb)

Sport
- Sport: Athletics
- Event: Long-distance running

Cormac Finnerty (born 14 January 1970) is an Irish long-distance runner. He competed in the men's 5000 metres at the 1996 Summer Olympics.

Finnerty competed for the Clemson Tigers track and field team, finishing 3rd in the 3000 m at the 1992 and 1993 NCAA Division I Indoor Track and Field Championships.

Finnerty won the British AAA Championships title in the 3,000 metres event at the 1997 AAA Championships.
