= Worku Bikila =

Ethiopian long-distance runner

Medal record

Men's athletics

Representing Ethiopia

African Championships
Silver medal – second place	1992 Belle Vue Harel	5000 m
Bronze medal – third place	1993 Durban	5000 m

Worku Bikila (born 6 May 1968) is a retired Ethiopian long-distance runner, who specialized mainly in the 5000 metres. His 10,000 metres time of 27:06.44 minutes in 1995 was the second-fastest time that year, behind Haile Gebrselassie. He represented Ethiopia at the World Championships in Athletics on three occasions (1993, 1995 and 1997). He was a two-time winner at the Zevenheuvelenloop 15,000 metres, from 1997 to 1998.

Since retiring, Bikila has put his energies into forming two companies that have brought much-needed revenue to his local community in Dukam, Ethiopia: Worku Bikila Water Well Drilling Limited performs water well monitoring, exploration, observation, and abandonment services, while Worku Bikila Hotel is a hotel for international travellers.

== International Competitions ==
Year	Competition	Venue	Position	Event	Notes
Representing Ethiopia
1992	African Championships	Belle Vue Maurel, Mauritius	2nd	5000 m	
1992	Olympic Games	Barcelona, Spain	6th	5000 m	
1993	World Championships	Stuttgart, Germany	4th	5000 m	
1993	African Championships	Durban, South Africa	3rd	5000 m	
1995	World Championships	Gothenburg, Sweden	6th	5000 m	
1997	World Championships	Athens, Greece	12th	5000 m	

== Personal bests ==
- 3000 metres – 7:42.44 min (1997)
- 5000 metres – 12:57.23 min (1995)
- 10,000 metres – 27:06.44 min (1995)
- Half marathon – 1:02:15 hrs (2002)
- Marathon – 2:11:48 hrs (2001)
