= Khalid Boulami =

Moroccan athletics competitor

Medal record

Men's athletics

Representing Morocco

Olympic Games
| Bronze medal – third place | 1996 Atlanta | 5000 m |

World Championships
| Silver medal – second place | 1995 Gothenburg | 5000 m |
| Silver medal – second place | 1997 Athens | 5000 m |

Khalid Boulami (born Safi, Morocco, August 7, 1969) is a Moroccan long-distance runner who won a bronze medal in the 5000 metres at the 1996 Olympic Games in Atlanta.

At the World Championships, he won two silver medals in the 5000 metres in 1995 and 1997.

He is the older brother of Brahim Boulami.

== Personal bests ==
- 3000 metres - 7:30.99 (1997)
- 5000 metres - 12:53.41 (1997)
- 2 miles - 8:10.98 (1996)
- 3000 metres steeplechase - 8:24.21 (1995)
- 10,000 metres - 28:48.43 (1994)
- 10 km - 27:17 (1993)
- 20 km - 59:05 (1993)

== International competitions ==
- 1997 World Championships in Athletics - silver medal (5000 m)
- 1997 IAAF Grand Prix Final - gold medal (5000 m)
- 1996 Summer Olympics - bronze medal (5000 m)
- 1995 World Championships in Athletics - silver medal (5000 m)
- 1995 IAAF Grand Prix Final - bronze medal (3000 m)
- 1994 IAAF Grand Prix Final - silver medal (5000 m)
- 1994 Jeux de la Francophonie - bronze medal (10.000 m)
