= Tom Nyariki =

Kenyan long-distance runner

Medal record

Men's athletics

Representing Kenya

World Championships
Bronze medal – third place	1997 Athens	5,000 m

African Championships
Gold medal – first place	1998 Dakar	3000 m

Tom ("Thomas") Nyariki (born 27 September 1971, in Nyamira) is a long-distance runner from Kenya. Most notably he won a bronze medal on the 5,000 metres at the 1997 World Championships.

Nyariki is married to Jackline Maranga. Nyariki represents the Kisii tribe from Nyanza.

He trains with Kimbia Athletics and is coached by Dieter Hogen. Recently he has competed mostly in road running races in the USA.

== Achievements ==
- 1998 IAAF World Cup - bronze medal (3000 m)
- 1998 IAAF World Cross Country Championships - fourth place
- 1997 IAAF Grand Prix Final - silver medal (5000 m)
- 1997 World Championships in Athletics - bronze medal (5000 m)
- 1997 IAAF World Cross Country Championships - third place

== Personal bests ==
- 3000 metres - 7:27.75 (1996)
- 5000 metres - 12:55.94 (1997)
- 10,000 metres - 27:48.12 (2002)
- 10 kilometres - 27:30 (2001)
- 5 kilometres - 13:24 (2001)
- 5 miles road - 22:32 (1999)
- marathon - 2:15:58 (2006)
