= Alyan Al-Qahtani =

Saudi Arabian long-distance runner

Personal information
- Nationality: Saudi Arabian
- Born: 23 August 1971 (age 54)

Sport
- Sport: Long-distance running
- Event: 10,000 metres
Medal record
Men's athletics
Representing Saudi Arabia
Asian Championships
Gold medal – first place	1993 Manila	10,000 m
Silver medal – second place	1993 Manila	5000 m

Alyan Al-Qahtani (Arabic: عليان القحطاني; born 23 August 1971) is a Saudi Arabian long-distance runner. He competed in the men's 10,000 metres at the 1996 Summer Olympics.
