= Manuel Pancorbo =

Spanish middle-distance runner

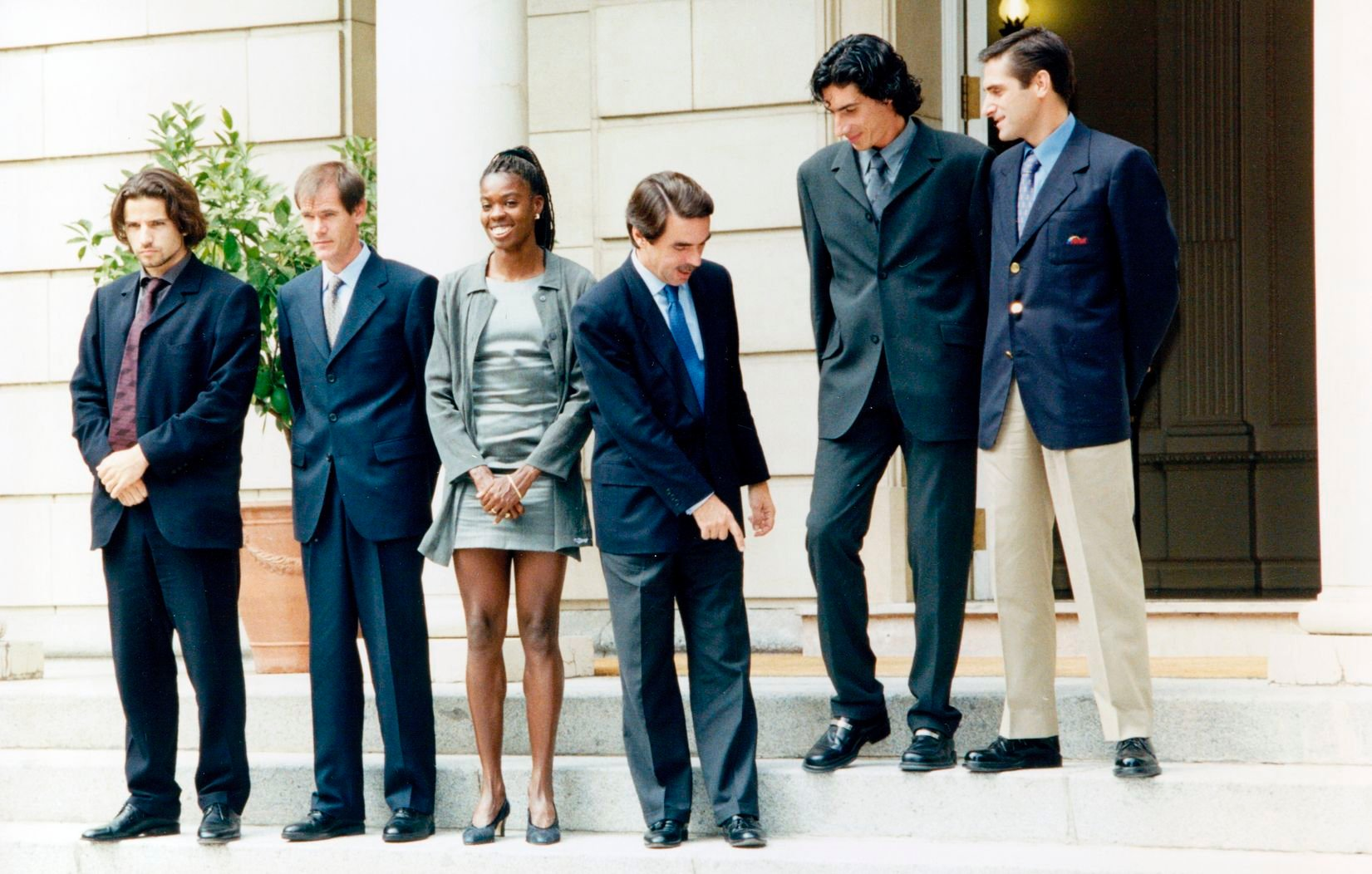
- Manuel Pancorbo (first from right) in 1999

Medal record

Men's athletics

Representing Spain

European Championships
| Silver medal – second place | 1998 Budapest | 5000 m |

Manuel Pancorbo Chica (born 7 July 1966 in Torredelcampo, Jaén) is a retired track and field athlete. He competed in the middle distances.

Pancorbo represented his native country Spain at two consecutive Summer Olympics in 1992 and 1996. He won the silver medal in the men's 3,000 metres at the 1998 European Indoor Championships.

Pancorbo is the first Spaniard to win the Cross Internacional de Soria and the only male Spanish athlete to do so.
