= Réda Benzine =

Algerian long-distance runner

Réda Benzine (born 19 April 1971) is an Algerian runner who specializes in the 5000 metres.

== Achievements ==
Year	Tournament	Venue	Result	Extra
1995	World Indoor Championships	Barcelona, Spain	10th	3000 m
1999	World Indoor Championships	Maebashi, Japan	12th	3000 m
2000	Olympic Games	Sydney, Australia	11th	5000 m

=== Personal bests ===
- 1500 metres – 3:41.36 min (1995)
- 3000 metres – 7:41.85 min (2000)
- 5000 metres – 13:21.88 min (1995)
- 10,000 metres – 28:15.15 min (1999)
