= Robert Denmark =

British runner (born 1968)

Rob Denmark
Personal information
- Nationality: British (English)
- Born: 23 November 1968 (age 57) Billericay, Essex, England
- Height: 174 cm (5 ft 9 in)
- Weight: 60 kg (132 lb)

Sport
- Sport: Athletics
- Event: Long-distance
- Club: Basildon AC
Medal record
Men's athletics
Representing Great Britain
World Indoor Championships
Bronze medal – third place	1991 Seville	3000 m
European Championships
Silver medal – second place	1994 Helsinki	5000 m
Representing England
Commonwealth Games
Gold medal – first place	1994 Victoria	5000 m

Robert Neil Denmark (born 23 November 1968) is a British former middle- and long-distance runner who won a gold medal in the 5000 metres at the 1994 Commonwealth Games, a silver medal in the 5000 metres at the 1994 European Championships, and a bronze medal in the 3000 metres at the 1991 IAAF World Indoor Championships. A two-time Olympian, he finished seventh in the 5000 metres final at the 1992 Barcelona Olympics.

== Career ==
Born in Billericay, Denmark began his international career by winning a bronze medal in the 3000 metres at the 1991 World Indoor Championships. A year later, he achieved his lifetime best in the 5000m with 13:10.24 at the Rome Grand Prix on 9 June, a time that still ranks him sixth on the UK all-time list (as of 2017). Two months later at the 1992 Barcelona Olympics, he finished seventh in the 5000 metres final. He also finished ninth in the 5000m finals at the 1991 and 1993 World Championships. In 1994, he won a silver medal in the 5000m at the European Championships behind Olympic champion Dieter Baumann, before going on to win the 5000m title at the Commonwealth Games a month later.

Denmark went on to compete at three more World Championships (1995–99), and in the 10,000m at the 2000 Sydney Olympics, without reaching the finals. He concluded his international career by competing at the 2002 Commonwealth Games.

He was twice the British 5000 metres champion after winning the British AAA Championships title at the 1995 AAA Championships and the 1999 AAA Championships. He was also three times British 10,000 metres champion winning the AAAs in 1994, 1996 and 2002.

Denmark attended Furtherwick Park School, on Canvey Island, and represented Basildon Athletic Club. He is still involved with athletics as a coach, coaching Guy Learmonth in 2016.

== International competitions ==
Year	Competition	Venue	Position	Event	Notes
Representing the Great Britain / England
1991	World Indoor Championships	Seville, Spain	3rd	3000 m	7:43.90
1991	World Championships	Tokyo, Japan	9th	5000 m	13:36.24
1992	Olympic Games	Barcelona, Spain	7th	5000 m	13:27.76
1993	World Championships	Stuttgart, Germany	9th	5000 m	13:27.09
1994	European Championships	Helsinki, Finland	2nd	5000 m	13:37.50
1994	Commonwealth Games	Victoria, Canada	1st	5000 m	13:23.00
1994	World Cup	London, United Kingdom	3rd	10,000 m	28:20.65
1995	World Championships	Gothenburg, Sweden	24th (heats)	5000 m	13:37.14
1997	World Championships	Athens, Greece	26th (heats)	5000 m	13:58.08
1999	World Championships	Seville, Spain	19th (heats)	5000 m	13:41.28
2000	Olympic Games	Sydney, Australia	28th (heats)	10,000 m	28:43.74
2002	Commonwealth Games	Manchester, United Kingdom	12th	10,000 m	29:09.59

== Personal bests ==
- 1500 m – 3:37.99 (1995)
- Mile – 3:55.38 (1990)
- 3000 m – 7:39.55 (1993)
- 5000 m – 13:10.24 (1992)
- 10,000 m – 28:03.31 (2000)
