= Shaun Creighton =

Australian long-distance runner

Personal information
- Born: 14 May 1967 (age 59) Sydney, Australia
- Life partner: Stella Creighton.
- Children: 2, Including William Creighton Born 2003 and Gretchen Creighton Born 2009.

Sport
- Sport: Track and field
Medal record
Representing Australia
Summer Universiade
Gold medal – first place	1991 Sheffield	3000 m steeplechase

Shaun William Creighton (born 14 May 1967) is an Australian long-distance runner. He holds the Australian record in the 3000m steeplechase and represented Australia at four Commonwealth Games and two Olympics. He continues to compete in masters athletics competitions.

== Achievements ==
Year	Competition	Venue	Position	Notes
Representing Australia
1990	Commonwealth Games	Auckland, New Zealand	5th	3000 m s'chase
1991	Universiade	Sheffield, England	1st	3000 m s'chase
1992	World Cup	Havana, Cuba	3rd	3000 m s'chase
1993	World Championships	Stuttgart, Germany	9th	3000 m s'chase
1994	Commonwealth Games	Victoria, Canada	11th	3000 m s'chase
1995	Australian National Championships	Sydney	1st	5000 m
1995	World Indoor Championships	Barcelona, Spain	7th	3000 m
1996	Australian National Championships	Sydney	1st	5000 m
1996	Olympic Games	Atlanta, United States	13h2	10,000 m
1996	Olympic Games	Atlanta, United States	14sf1	5000 m
1998	Australian National Championships	Melbourne	1st	5000 m
1998	World Cup	Johannesburg, South Africa	2nd	5000 m
1998	Commonwealth Games	Kuala Lumpur, Malaysia	9th	marathon
1999	World Championships	Seville, Spain	DNF	marathon
2000	Olympic Games	Sydney	14h1	10,000 m
2002	Commonwealth Games	Manchester, United Kingdom	9th	marathon

=== Personal bests ===
- 1500 metres – 3:38.59 min (1993)
- Mile run – 3:59.46 min (1995)
- 3000 metres – 7:41.60 min (1995)
- 3000 metres steeplechase – 8:16.22 min (1993)
- 5000 metres – 13:17.76 min (1995)
- 10,000 metres – 27:31.92 min (1996)
- Half marathon – 1:03:34 min (1998)
- Marathon – 2:10:22 min (1997)

=== Recognition ===
- 2026 - Inducted into the ACT Sport Hall of Fame
