= Ismaïl Sghyr =

French-Moroccan long-distance runner

Personal information
- Born: March 16, 1972 (age 54)
Medal record
Men's athletics
Representing Morocco
Mediterranean Games
Gold medal – first place	1997 Bari	10,000 m
Representing France
European Championships
Silver medal – second place	2002 Munich	5000 m

Ismaïl Sghyr (Arabic: اسماعيل صغير; born March 16, 1972, in Taroudannt) is a French-Moroccan long-distance runner. He won a bronze medal at the over 3000 metres at the 1997 IAAF World Indoor Championships. In 5000 metres he finished fourth at the World Championships the same year, as well as winning a bronze medal at the 2002 European Championships. Over 10,000 metres he won at the 1997 Mediterranean Games.

Sghyr formerly represented Morocco, but as many other Moroccan runners he switched nationality to France.
