= Ismael Kirui =

Kenyan long-distance runner

Medal record

Men's Athletics

Representing Kenya

World Championships
Gold medal – first place	1993 Stuttgart	5,000 m
Gold medal – first place	1995 Gothenburg	5,000 m

World Junior Championships
Silver medal – second place	1990 Plovdiv	10,000 m

Ismael Kirui (born 20 February 1975 in Kapcherop, Marakwet District) is a former Kenyan long-distance runner who won gold medals over 5000 metres at the 1993 and 1995 World Championships in Athletics.

His victory in Stuttgart in 1993 was especially impressive as he was only aged eighteen and led the race from the front for most of the second half. On the final straight he shrugged off an attack from Haile Gebrselassie. His winning time of 13:02.75 minutes was a new World Championships record. He became the youngest world champion, aged 18 years 177 days. That same year he broke the World junior record in 5000 metres in Zurich by running 13:06.50.

His gold medal in 1995 was won under very different circumstances as the final was run at a slow pace and decided in a sprint.

Ismael Kirui is the younger brother of Richard Chelimo. Other relatives include brother William "Willy" Kirui, half-sister Catherine Kirui and cousins Moses Kiptanui and William Mutwol. He is married to Rose Cheruiyot. He and Cheruiyot completed an unusual married couple's double when they won the men's and women's races, respectively, at the Belfast International Cross Country in 1995.

An accomplished road race runner, Kirui won three consecutive Bay to Breakers 12K titles, from 1993 to 1995. His first victory in 33:42 set a world road record in that event.

Sporting positions
Preceded by Moses Kiptanui	Men's 5,000 m Best Year Performance; 1993	Succeeded by Haile Gebrselassie
