= Bob Kennedy (runner) =

American distance runner (born 1970)

Robert Owen Kennedy Jr. (born August 18, 1970, in Bloomington, Indiana) is an American distance runner. Now retired, in 1996 he was ranked 4th in the world at the 5000 meters. He once held the American record in the 3000 meters (7:30.84), 2 miles (8:11.59) and the 5000 meters (12:58.21).

He was the first ever non-African to run the 5000 meters in less than thirteen minutes, and as of 2012 he is still one of only seven non-Africans to do so. He is regarded as one of the greatest U.S. distance runners in history.

== Prep school competition ==
Kennedy was twice state champion in cross country while at Westerville North High School, with winning times of 15:31.8 (1986) and 15:03.2 (1987). Kennedy was the 1987 national junior champion in cross country, winning the Kinney Cross Country Championship at Morley Field in San Diego, California, on December 12, 1987, with a time of 14:59.0. He held the OHSAA record for 1600 Meters at 4:05.13 until 2018.

== College career ==
Kennedy opted to compete for the Indiana Hoosiers and won 16 Big Ten Conference track titles. In 1988, he won the NCAA Men's Cross Country Championship, becoming one of a few true freshman ever to win the event. He won the NCAA 1500 meter championship in 1990 and the NCAA indoor mile championship in 1991. During his senior year, Kennedy won a second NCAA Men's Cross Country Championship and the USATF National Cross Country Championships. He was the second person in history to win both titles in the same year. In fact, nobody had won both titles since Al Lawrence in 1959 and 1960.

Kennedy's second USATF National Cross Country title came in 2004. The twelve-year gap between those two titles was the longest in USATF history. Kennedy participated in several World Cross Country championships, finishing as high as 12th place in 1995.

== Olympics ==
The highlight of Kennedy's career came in the 1996 Atlanta Olympics. In the 5000 meter finals, Kennedy surged to the front at the beginning of the penultimate lap and forced the pace. He held the lead for almost a lap and was ultimately passed just before the closing lap, eventually placing 6th. He had also made it to the finals of the 1992 Olympic 5000 m race and placed 12th with a time of 13:39.72 min after running 13:35.76 min in qualifying. He also ran the 5000 m in the World Championships in Athletics for the US in 1991 (12th), 1993, 1995 (12th), 1997 (6th), and 1999 (9th).

Kennedy held American records for the 3000 m (7:30.84 min in 1998) and 5,000-meter races (12:58.21 min in 1996). He participated in workouts with Kenyan athletes also coached by Kim McDonald at the group's training bases in the U.S., Australia and England. McDonald rarely gave his athletes goal times for workouts, and they regularly ran sub-4 minute miles in practice

Kennedy suffered a back injury in an auto accident before the 2000 Olympic Trials and missed seven weeks of training, as a result of the injury he was not able to make the Olympic team that year. In 2001, he was hindered by thyroid problems. He returned to win the USA Track & Field (USATF) Championships 5000 meter race against Colorado grad Adam Goucher, who by then was largely seen to be Kennedy's successor. He was able to beat the younger and faster Goucher by alternating the pace between each lap, surging then slowing, forcing Goucher to come to him after each surge and blunting Goucher's finishing kick. In all, Kennedy was four time USATF National Champion in the 5,000 – 1995, 1996, 1997, and 2001.

After running a personal best of 27:37 in the spring of 2004, Kennedy competed in the 2004 US Olympic Trials in the 10,000 meter race, but had to drop out of the race due to aggravation of an Achilles tendon injury he had suffered in the weeks leading up to the Olympic trials. After recovering from the injury he briefly tried his hand at the marathon, dropping out of the New York City marathon that autumn and since then has retired from competitive distance running.

== Nike branding ==
Nike has created two racing spikes in honor of him, the Nike Kennedy XC and Nike Zoom Kennedy. Both are popular and sought-after racing spikes; however the Nike Zoom Kennedy has been discontinued and the Kennedy XC has been renamed the GHAC XC, due to the expiration of Bob Kennedy's endorsement contract with Nike. In May 2006 Kennedy signed a three-year contract with Puma.

== Personal Best Times ==
- 1500 meters 3:38.2
- Mile 3:56.21
- 2000 meters 4:59.9
- 3000 meters 7:30.84 (Former American Record)
- 2 miles 8:11.59 (Former American Record)
- 5000 meters 12:58.21 (Former American Record)
- 10,000 meters 27:37.45
