= Dieter Baumann =

German long-distance runner

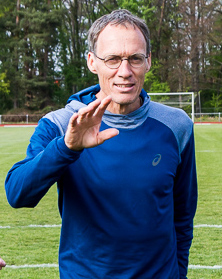
- Baumann in 2017

Personal information
- Born: 9 February 1965 (age 61) Blaustein, West Germany
Medal record
Men's athletics
Representing Germany
Olympic Games
Gold medal – first place	1992 Barcelona	5000 m
Silver medal – second place	1988 Seoul	5000 m
European Championships
Gold medal – first place	1994 Helsinki	5000 m
Silver medal – second place	1998 Budapest	10,000 m
Silver medal – second place	2002 Munich	10,000 m

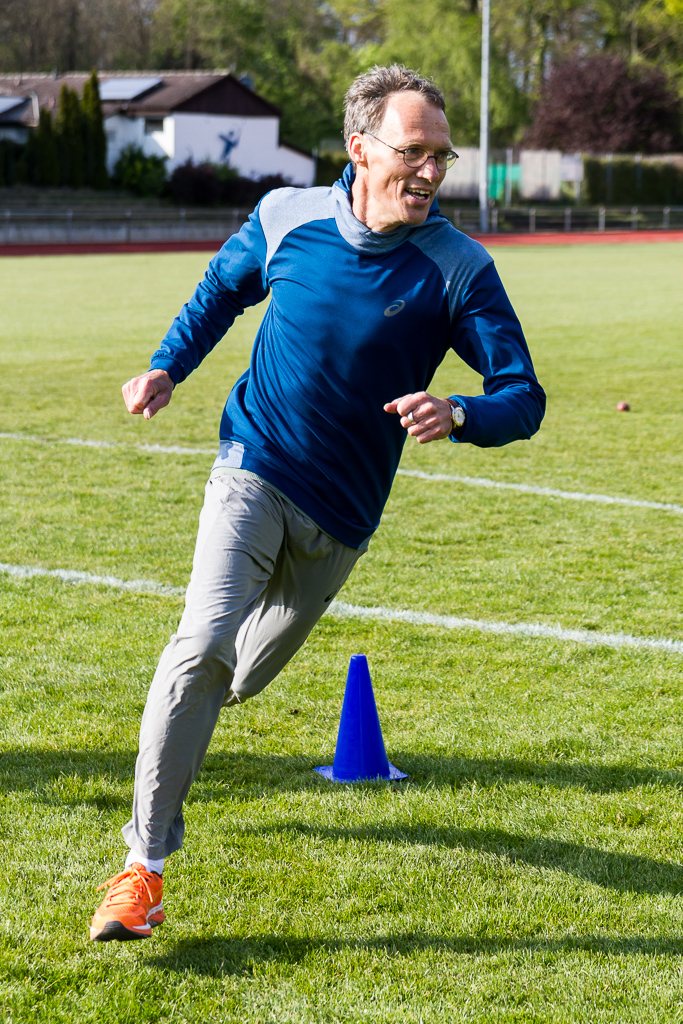
Baumann in 2017

Dieter Baumann (German pronunciation: [ˈdiːtɐ ˈbaʊ̯ˌman], audio; born 9 February 1965) is a German former athlete and 5000 m Olympic champion at the 1992 Summer Olympics. He also won the silver medal in the same event (5000 m) at the 1988 Summer Olympics.

In 1999, Baumann tested positive for the performance-enhancing drug nandrolone and received a two-year suspension from athletic competition.

== Biography ==
Born in Blaustein, West Germany, Baumann was one of the few non-African athletes who were able to seriously challenge the African dominance of middle-distance running during the 1990s. Baumann was equally adept at both the 1500 m and 5000 m distances.

Although Baumann came second in the 3000 m at the European Indoor Championships in 1987, few considered him a medal chance at the 1988 Summer Olympics. The 5000 m final at Seoul was won by John Ngugi from Kenya who broke away from the field early in the race. However, Baumann used his superior 1500 m speed to outsprint the rest of the field in the final lap to win the silver medal. Baumann missed most of the 1990 season due to tendon trouble, but he returned in 1991 to finish fourth in the 5000 m at the World Championships in Tokyo. At the end of the season, Baumann unexpectedly beat the Kenyan 5000 m world champion Yobes Ondieki over 3000 m in Cologne.

In early 1992, Baumann narrowly missed the 3000 m world indoor record. In June, at a meeting in Seville, he set a new German record over 5000 m (13:09.03). At the Olympics in Barcelona, the 5000 m final started at a fast pace, but then slowed, increasing Baumann's advantage due to his finishing kick. However, he got boxed in amongst four African runners in the back straight of the last lap, and was only able to get out into the clear coming into the home straight. From there, Baumann launched into a devastating sprint to pass his opponents and win the gold medal. Later that year, Baumann pre-announced a world record attempt over 3000 m for the meeting in Cologne. However, he did not win the race as Moses Kiptanui snatched the victory away by setting a new world record.

Baumann missed the next season due to injury, but was back at the European Championships in 1994. In the 5000 m final, Baumann was always well placed in the field, and used his trademark devastating kick to outsprint Rob Denmark of the UK in the final lap to win the gold medal. At the World Championships in Gothenburg, in the 5000 m final, Baumann inexplicably lost contact with the leading group with three laps to go, and struggled home in a disappointing ninth place. However, a few days after the disappointment of Gothenburg, Baumann ran one of the fastest races in his career when he broke his national record (13:01.72) to come second in Zürich behind Haile Gebrselassie.

At the 1996 Olympic Games in Atlanta, Baumann would find it a difficult challenge to successfully defend his Olympic title, because the other athletes had been setting much faster times than Baumann's during 1995 and 1996 seasons. But Baumann still managed to finish in a creditable fourth place.

On his third World Championships in Athens, Baumann finished fifth in the 5000 m. In Zürich, a few days later, he became the first European runner to break the 13-minute barrier when he finished in 12:54.70 min.

In the next year, he won a silver medal in 10,000 m at the European Championships held in Budapest. He also tried to defend his title over 5000 m but did not even come close to winning a medal. In one of his last great races, he set a new personal best over 3000 m in Monte Carlo (Monaco) in 7:30.50 min in August 1998.

=== Doping suspension ===
On 19 October 1999, Baumann tested positive for nandrolone and received a two-year suspension, thus missing the 2000 Summer Olympics. Baumann was voluntarily tested after the initial results by an independent institute. Extremely high levels of nandrolone continued to be found in the tests and the results of the tests fluctuated dramatically depending on which time of day Baumann was tested. After several weeks of voluntary tests, Baumann claimed that the results varied with the time of day because the nandrolone was in his toothpaste. The German Athletics Federation (DLV) stated that they believed Baumann that someone had manipulated his toothpaste and allowed him to start at the German championships where Baumann qualified for the Olympic Games in Sydney. However, the IAAF did not agree with that verdict and imposed a ban. Baumann tried to sue the IAAF before a German court but was unsuccessful. Those defending Baumann have pointed to the fact that the levels of nandrolone found in his body were completely abnormal for any athlete wishing to enhance his performance. Baumann's opponents argued that he had no conclusive proof for his version of the story and could not name a suspect.

After the ban, Baumann came back in 2002 at the age of 37 and won the silver medal at 10,000 m at the European Championships in Munich. Baumann participated in the 2003 World Championships in Athletics in Paris at 10,000 m but did not finish the race. He retired in late 2003.

== Personal life ==
His daughter, Jackie Baumann, is a hurdler.

Awards
Preceded by (Germany) Michael Stich	German Sportsman of the Year; 1992	Succeeded by (Germany) Henry Maske
Sporting positions
Preceded by (Morocco) Saïd Aouita	Men's 3000 m Best Year Performance; 1987	Succeeded by (United States) Sydney Maree
Preceded by (Morocco) Khalid Skah	Men's 3000 m Best Year Performance; 1991	Succeeded by (Kenya) Moses Kiptanui
