= Brahim Lahlafi =

Moroccan long-distance runner

Medal record

Men's athletics

Representing Morocco

Olympic Games
| Bronze medal – third place | 2000 Sydney | 5,000 m |

African Championships
| Silver medal – second place | 1998 Dakar | 3000 m |

Brahim Lahlafi (Arabic: إبراهيم لحلافي) (born 15 April 1968, in Fes) is a retired long-distance runner who represented Morocco during his active career. He acquired French citizenship on 6 April 2002, but represented Morocco again from 15 March 2007.

His greatest achievement was an Olympic bronze medal in 2000. This was his first medal at a major international event, having narrowly missed the podium at the 1995 World Cross Country Championships (5th place) and twice in 5,000 metres at the World Championships, in 1995 (5th) and 1999 (fourth). He did win a bronze medal in the 3,000 metres event at the 1998 African Championships.

In 1996, he was the winner of the inaugural Belgrade Race Through History competition. He beat Paul Tergat to the finish line of the 6 km race and remains the course record holder of the competition.

== Personal bests ==
- 1,500 metres - 3:43.2 (1996)
- 3,000 metres - 7:28.94 (1999)
- 5,000 metres - 12:49.28 (2000)
- 10,000 metres - 27:43.05 (1995)
- Half marathon - 1:01:39 (1994)

Sporting positions
| Preceded by Haile Gebrselassie | Men's 5,000 m Best Year Performance; 2000 | Succeeded by Richard Limo |
