= List of flag bearers for Burundi at the Olympics =

Burundi at the Olympics
- IOC code: BDI
- NOC: Comité National Olympique du Burundi
- Medals: Gold 1 Silver 1 Bronze 0 Total 2

Summer appearances
- 1996; 2000; 2004; 2008; 2012; 2016; 2020; 2024

This is a list of flag bearers who have represented Burundi at the Olympics.

Flag bearers carry the national flag of their country at the opening ceremony of the Olympic Games.

#	Event year	Season	Flag bearer	Sport
1	1996	Summer	Dieudonné Kwizera	Athletics
2	2000	Summer	Diane Nukuri	Athletics
3	2004	Summer	Emery Nziyunvira	Swimming
4	2008	Summer	Francine Niyonizigiye	Athletics
5	2012	Summer	Diane Nukuri	Athletics
6	2016	Summer	Olivier Irabaruta	Athletics
7	2020	Summer	Belly-Cresus Ganira	Swimming
7	2020	Summer	Ornella Havyarimana	Boxing
8	2024	Summer	Belly-Cresus Ganira	Swimming
8	2024	Summer	Ange Niragira	Judo

== See also ==
- Burundi at the Olympics
