= Burundi at the 2020 Summer Olympics =

- IOC code: BDI
- NOC: Comité National Olympique du Burundi

in Tokyo, Japan July 23, 2021 – August 8, 2021
- Competitors: 6 in 3 sports
- Flag bearers (opening): Ornella Havyarimana; Belly-Cresus Ganira
- Flag bearer (closing): N/A
- Medals: Gold 0 Silver 0 Bronze 0 Total 0

Summer Olympics appearances (overview)
- 1996; 2000; 2004; 2008; 2012; 2016; 2020; 2024

The Burundi competed at the 2020 Summer Olympics in Tokyo. Originally scheduled to take place from 24 July to 9 August 2020, the Games have been postponed to 23 July to 8 August 2021, because of the COVID-19 pandemic. It was the nation's seventh consecutive appearance at the Summer Olympics after its debut at the 1996 Summer Olympics.

Burundi was represented by three athletes who competed across two sports. Ornella Havyarimana and Belly-Cresus Ganira served as the country's flag-bearer during the opening ceremony and a volunteer carried the flag during the closing ceremony. The nation did not win any medals in the Games.

== Background ==
The National Olympic Committee of Burundi was formed in 1990 and was approved by the International Olympic Committee (IOC) in 1993. The 1996 Summer Olympics marked Burundi's first participation as an independent nation in the Olympic Games. After the nation made its debut in the Summer Olympics at the 1996 Games, it competed in every Summer Olympics. This edition of the Games in 2020 marked the nation's seventh appearance at the Summer Games.

The 2020 Summer Olympics in Tokyo was originally scheduled to take place from 24 July to 9 August 2020. The Games were later postponed to 23 July to 8 August 2021 due to the COVID-19 pandemic. Burundi was represented by six athletes who competed across three sports. Ornella Havyarimana and Belly-Cresus Ganira served as the country's flag-bearer during the opening ceremony and a volunteer carried the flag during the closing ceremony. The nation did not win any medals in the Games.

== Competitors ==
Burundi was represented by six athletes who competed across three sports.

Sport	Men	Women	Total
Athletics	2	1	3
Boxing	0	1	1
Swimming	1	1	2
Total	3	3	6

== Athletics ==
As per the governing body World Athletics (WA), a NOC was allowed to enter up to three qualified athletes in each individual event and one qualified relay team if the Olympic Qualifying Standards (OQS) for the respective events had been met during the qualifying period. The remaining places were allocated based on the World Athletics Rankings which were derived from the average of the best five results for an athlete over the designated qualifying period, weighted by the importance of the meet.

Three Burundian athletes achieved the entry standards and qualified for the event. Eric Nzikwinkunda failed to progress past the heats in the men's 800 m. Olivier Irabaruta finished 39th in the men's marathon event. Francine Niyonsaba finished fifth in the women's 10000 m, while setting a new national record in the process.

Key

- Note–Ranks given for track events are within the athlete's heat only
- Q = Qualified for the next round
- q = Qualified for the next round as a fastest loser or, in field events, by position without achieving the qualifying target
- NR = National record
- N/A = Round not applicable for the event
- Bye = Athlete not required to compete in round

Track & road events

Athlete	Event	Heat		Semifinal		Final	
Athlete	Event	Result	Rank	Result	Rank	Result	Rank
Eric Nzikwinkunda	Men's 800 m	1:47.97	6	Did not advance			
Olivier Irabaruta	Men's marathon	—				2:17:44 SB	39
Francine Niyonsaba	Women's 5000 m	DSQ		—		Did not advance	
Francine Niyonsaba	Women's 10000 m	—				30:41.93 NR	5

== Boxing ==
The qualification to the Olympic Games was determined by the performance of the boxers at the four continental Olympic qualifying tournaments (Africa, Americas, Asia & Oceania, and Europe) and at the World Olympic qualification tournament. The final list of qualifiers was announced on 15 July 2021, and Burundi received an invitation from the Tripartite Commission to send the women's flyweight boxer Ornella Havyarimana to the Olympics, marking the country's debut in the sport. However, she lost in the first round to Nina Radovanović of Serbia.

Athlete	Event	Round of 32	Round of 16	Quarterfinals	Semifinals	Final	
Athlete	Event	Opposition Result	Opposition Result	Opposition Result	Opposition Result	Opposition Result	Rank
Ornella Havyarimana	Women's flyweight	Bye	Radovanović (SRB); L 0–5	Did not advance			

== Swimming ==
As per the Fédération internationale de natation (FINA) guidelines, a NOC was permitted to enter a maximum of two qualified athletes in each individual event, who have achieved the Olympic Qualifying Time (OQT). If the quota was not filled, one athlete per event was allowed to enter, provided they achieved the Olympic Selection Time (OST). The qualifying time standards should have been achieved in competitions approved by World Aquatics in the period between 1 March 2019 to 27 June 2021. FINA also allowed NOCs to enter swimmers (one per gender) under a universality place even if they have not achieved the standard entry times (OQT/OST). Burundi received a universality invitation from FINA to send two top-ranked swimmers (one per gender) in their respective individual events to the Olympics, based on the FINA Points System of 28 June 2021. Belly-Cresus Ganira and Odrina Kaze did not progress past the heats in the men's 100 m freestyle and women's 50 m freestyle events respectively.

Athlete	Event	Heat		Semifinal		Final	
Athlete	Event	Time	Rank	Time	Rank	Time	Rank
Belly-Cresus Ganira	Men's 100 m freestyle	54.33	64	Did not advance			
Odrina Kaze	Women's 50 m freestyle	33.39	79	Did not advance			
