= Burundi at the 2008 Summer Olympics =

- IOC code: BDI
- NOC: Comité National Olympique du Burundi

in Beijing
- Competitors: 3 in 2 sports
- Flag bearer: Francine Niyonizigiye
- Medals: Gold 0 Silver 0 Bronze 0 Total 0

Summer Olympics appearances (overview)
- 1996; 2000; 2004; 2008; 2012; 2016; 2020; 2024; 2028

Burundi participated in the 2008 Summer Olympics, held in Beijing, China from 8 to 24 August 2008. It was Burundi's fourth appearance in the summer Olympics since its debut in 1996. The Burundi team included three athletes: runners Joachim Nshimirimana and Francine Niyonizigiye, as well as swimmer Elsie Uwamahoro. Niyonizigiye, a marathon runner, was flag bearer for the opening ceremony. None of the Burundi athletes progressed further than the qualifying round.

== Background ==
Burundi had participated in three previous Summer Olympics, between its debut in the 1996 Summer Olympics in Atlanta, United States and the 2008 Summer Olympics in Beijing. At its debut, the country sent seven athletes to the games, all of whom competed in athletics. The largest number of Burundian athletes participating in the summer games is seven in 1996 and 2004. The only Burundian competitor to win a medal at the Olympics was Vénuste Niyongabo, who won gold in the men's 5000 metres in 1996. Three athletes from Burundi were selected to compete in the 2008 Olympics: Joachim Nshimirimana in the men's marathon, Francine Niyonizigiye in the women's track and field 5000 metres and Elsie Uwamahoro in the women's 50 metre freestyle swimming.

== Athletics ==
=== Men's competition ===
At the 2008 Olympics, Burundi was represented by one male in athletics, marathon runner Joachim Nshimirimana. At age 35, Nshimirimana was the country's oldest competitor, and was competing at his second Olympics. He competed in the 2004 Olympics, also in marathon. He competed on the 24 August in Beijing, and finished 68th out of 95 (Note: 19 of the 95 athletes did not finish.) in a time of 2 hours, 29 minutes and 55 seconds, over 23 minutes behind the winner, Samuel Kamau Wanjiru.

Athlete	Event	Final	
Athlete	Event	Result	Rank
Joachim Nshimirimana	Marathon	2:29:55	68

=== Women's competition ===
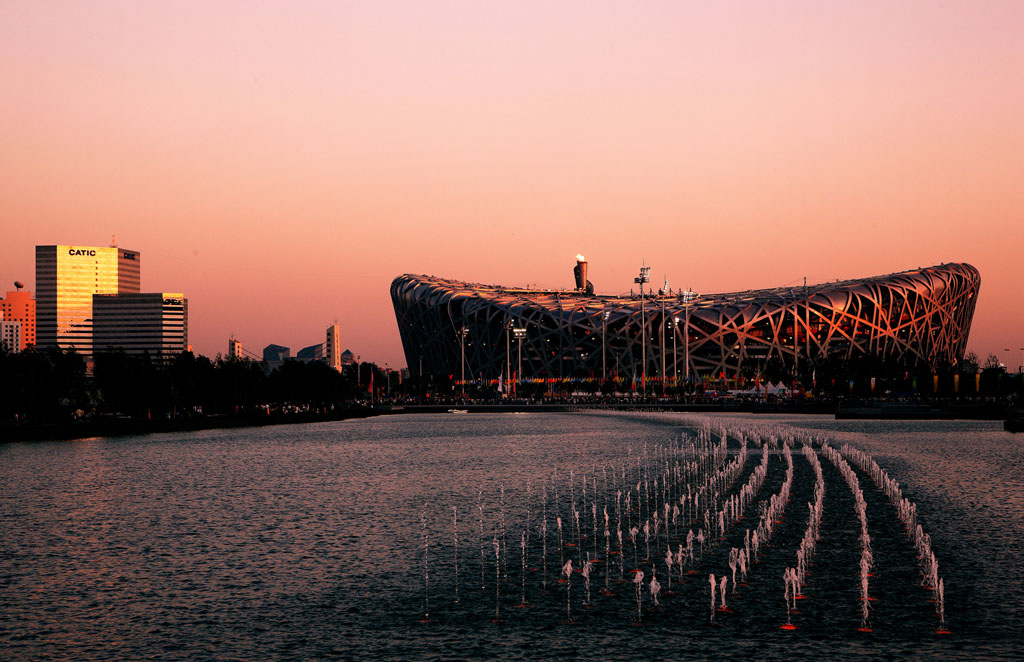
The Beijing National Stadium, where Nshimirimana and Niyonizigiye competed in track and field events

Francine Niyonizigiye, Burundi's flag bearer at the opening ceremony, competed on Burundi's behalf at the Beijing Olympics, in the women's 5000 metre races. Born in 1988, Niyonizigiye was 19 years old at the 2008 Olympics. Niyonizigiye previously competed in the 2004 Olympics, also in the 5000 metres. During the qualification round, which took place on August 19, Niyonizigiye competed in the sixteen-person second heat. (Note: One of the 16 athletes did not start the event.) She finished the race in 17 minutes, 8.44 seconds, finishing in fourteenth place, the last of the finishing athletes, after Russia's Yelena Zadorozhnaya was disqualified. Niyonizigiye finished just under a minute behind thirteenth placing Hungarian Krisztina Papp. The heat itself was led by Ethiopia's Meseret Defar (14 minutes 56.32 seconds). Of the 32 competitors to finish the event's first round, Niyonizigiye ranked 31st. She did not advance to later rounds.

Athlete	Event	Heat		Final	
Athlete	Event	Time	Rank	Time	Rank
Francine Niyonizigiye	5000 m	17:08.44	14	Did not advance	

== Swimming ==
Burundi had one woman competing in swimming at the 2008 Olympics, Elsie Uwamahoro, who competed in the 50-metre freestyle. Beijing was Uwamahoro's first Olympics. She was selected to compete in the second heat on 15 August. Uwamahoro finished seventh out of eight athletes in her heat, in a time of 36.86 seconds. She finished ahead of Mariama Souley Bana from Niger (40.83 seconds). The heat was led by Zakia Nassar from Palestine and Karishma Karki from Nepal who swam 31.97 and 32.35 seconds, respectively. Her time placed her 86th out of 90 athletes and she did not qualify for the semi-finals.

Athlete	Event	Heat		Semifinal		Final	
Athlete	Event	Time	Rank	Time	Rank	Time	Rank
Elsie Uwamahoro	Women's 50 m freestyle	36.86	86	Did not advance			
