= Burundi at the 2016 Summer Olympics =

- IOC code: BDI
- NOC: Comité National Olympique du Burundi

in Rio de Janeiro
- Competitors: 9 in 3 sports
- Flag bearer: Olivier Irabaruta
- Medals Ranked 69th: Gold 0 Silver 1 Bronze 0 Total 1

Summer Olympics appearances (overview)
- 1996; 2000; 2004; 2008; 2012; 2016; 2020; 2024

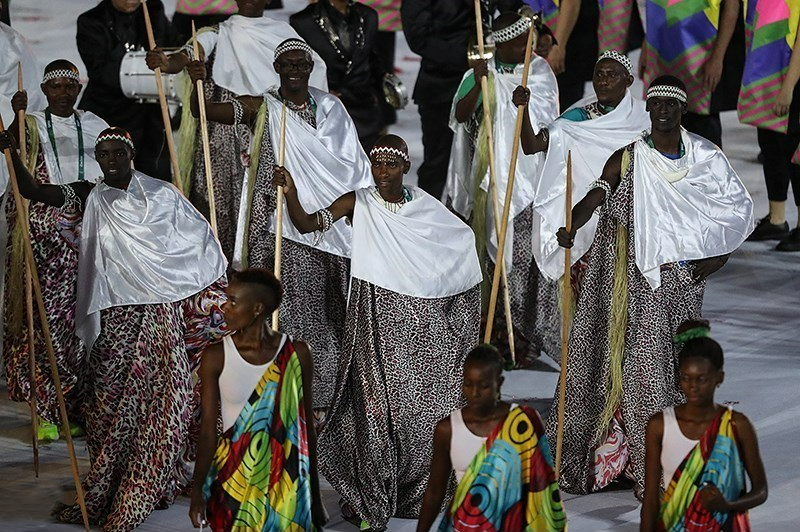
Burundi at the 2016 Summer Olympics opening ceremony.

Burundi competed at the 2016 Summer Olympics in Rio de Janeiro, Brazil, from 5 to 21 August 2016. This was the nation's sixth consecutive appearance at the Summer Olympics.

The Burundi Olympic Committee (French: Comité National Olympique du Burundi) sent the nation's largest delegation to the Games. Nine athletes, five men and four women, were selected to the Burundian team across three different sports, with nearly half of them having previously competed at London 2012. Among the Burundian athletes on the team were world indoor champion Francine Niyonsaba, second-place finalist in the women's 800 metres, marathoner Diane Nukuri, and long-distance runner Olivier Irabaruta, who became the nation's flag bearer in the opening ceremony.

Burundi left Rio de Janeiro with its first Olympic medal since the nation's debut in 1996. It was awarded to Niyonsaba, who rebounded from an out-of-podium feat back in London to end Burundi's 20-year drought with a silver in her pet event.

== Medalists ==
Medal	Name	Sport	Event	Date
Silver	Francine Niyonsaba	Athletics	Women's 800 metres	20 August

== Athletics (track and field) ==
Burundian athletes achieved qualifying standards in the following athletics events (up to a maximum of 3 athletes in each event):

Key

- Note–Ranks given for track events are within the athlete's heat only
- Q = Qualified for the next round
- q = Qualified for the next round as a fastest loser or, in field events, by position without achieving the qualifying target
- NR = National record
- N/A = Round not applicable for the event
- Bye = Athlete not required to compete in round

Track & road events

Athlete	Event	Heat		Semifinal		Final	
Athlete	Event	Result	Rank	Result	Rank	Result	Rank
Antoine Gakeme	Men's 800 m	1:47.46	6	Did not advance			
Olivier Irabaruta	Men's 5,000 m	13:44.08	17	—		Did not advance	
Olivier Irabaruta	Men's 10,000 m	—				28:32.75	27
Pierre-Célestin Nihorimbere	Men's marathon	—				2:29:38	115
Abraham Niyonkuru	Men's marathon	—				DNF	
Francine Niyonsaba	Women's 800 m	1:59.84	1 Q	1:59.59	2 Q	1:56.49	2nd place, silver medalist(s)
Diane Nukuri	Women's 10,000 m	—				31:28.69 NR	13

== Judo ==
Burundi received an invitation from the Tripartite Commission to send a judoka competing in the women's half-lightweight category (52 kg) to the Olympics.

Athlete	Event	Round of 32	Round of 16	Quarterfinals	Semifinals	Repechage	Final / BM	
Athlete	Event	Opposition Result	Opposition Result	Opposition Result	Opposition Result	Opposition Result	Opposition Result	Rank
Antoinette Gasongo	Women's −52 kg	Ramos (POR); L 000–102	Did not advance					

== Swimming ==
Burundi received a Universality invitation from FINA to send two swimmers (one male and one female) to the Olympics.

Athlete	Event	Heat		Semifinal		Final	
Athlete	Event	Time	Rank	Time	Rank	Time	Rank
Billy-Scott Irakose	Men's 50 m freestyle	26.36	66	Did not advance			
Elsie Uwamahoro	Women's 50 m freestyle	33.70	80	Did not advance			
