= Burundi at the 2012 Summer Olympics =

- IOC code: BDI
- NOC: Comité National Olympique du Burundi

in London
- Competitors: 6 in 3 sports
- Flag bearer: Diane Nukuri
- Medals: Gold 0 Silver 0 Bronze 0 Total 0

Summer Olympics appearances (overview)
- 1996; 2000; 2004; 2008; 2012; 2016; 2020; 2024

Burundi competed at the 2012 Summer Olympics in London, United Kingdom from 27 July to 12 August 2012. This was the nation's fifth appearance at the Olympics.

Comité National Olympique du Burundi sent a total of six athletes to the Games, 4 women and 2 men, to compete only in athletics, judo, and swimming. Swimmer Elsie Uwamahoro was the only athlete in the team to participate in her second Olympics. Marathon runner Diane Nukuri, the oldest athlete of the team, made an Olympic comeback in London after a twelve-year absence, and reprised her role as Burundi's flag bearer at the opening ceremony.

Burundi, however, failed to win a single Olympic medal in London. Track runner Francine Niyonsaba qualified for the final rounds in the women's 800 metres, but narrowly missed out of the nation's first ever medal after 16 years, finishing abruptly in seventh place.

== Athletics ==
Athletes have achieved qualifying standards in the following athletics events (up to a maximum of 3 athletes in each event at the 'A' Standard, and 1 at the 'B' Standard):

Men

Athlete	Event	Heat		Final	
Athlete	Event	Result	Rank	Result	Rank
Olivier Irabaruta	5000 m	13:46.25	13	did not advance	

Women

Athlete	Event	Heat		Semifinal		Final	
Athlete	Event	Result	Rank	Result	Rank	Result	Rank
Francine Niyonsaba	800 m	2:07.57	1 Q	1:58.67	2 Q	1:59.63	7
Diane Nukuri	Marathon	—				2:30:12	31

Key

- Note–Ranks given for track events are within the athlete's heat only
- Q = Qualified for the next round
- q = Qualified for the next round as a fastest loser or, in field events, by position without achieving the qualifying target
- NR = National record
- N/A = Round not applicable for the event
- Bye = Athlete not required to compete in round

== Judo ==
Burundi has had 1 judoka invited.

Athlete	Event	Round of 32	Round of 16	Quarterfinals	Semifinals	Repechage	Final / BM	
Athlete	Event	Opposition Result	Opposition Result	Opposition Result	Opposition Result	Opposition Result	Opposition Result	Rank
Odette Ntahonvukiye	Women's −78 kg	Koumba (GAB); L 0000–0020	did not advance					

== Swimming ==
Burundi has gained two "Universality places" from the FINA.

Men

Athlete	Event	Heat		Semifinal		Final	
Athlete	Event	Time	Rank	Time	Rank	Time	Rank
Beni Binobagira	100 m freestyle	1:04.57	56	did not advance			

Women

Athlete	Event	Heat		Semifinal		Final	
Athlete	Event	Time	Rank	Time	Rank	Time	Rank
Elsie Uwamahoro	50 m freestyle	33.14	66	did not advance			

== See also ==
- Burundi at the 2012 Summer Paralympics
