= Burundi at the Olympics =

- IOC code: BDI
- NOC: Comité National Olympique du Burundi
- Medals Ranked 111th: Gold 1 Silver 1 Bronze 0 Total 2

Summer appearances
- 1996; 2000; 2004; 2008; 2012; 2016; 2020; 2024

Burundi first participated at the 1996 Olympic Games, and has sent athletes to compete in every Summer Olympic Games since then. The nation has never participated in the Winter Olympic Games.

Vénuste Niyongabo won a gold medal in athletics on August 3rd 1996 at the 1996 Olympic Games that were held in Atlanta, and Francine Niyonsaba added a silver 20 years later in athletics on August 20th 2016 at the 2016 Olympic games that were held in Rio de Janeiro.

The Burundi National Olympic Committee was created in 1990 and recognized by the International Olympic Committee in 1993.

== Medal tables ==
=== Medals by Summer Games ===
Games	Athletes	Gold	Silver	Bronze	Total	Rank
(United States) 1996 Atlanta	7	1	0	0	1	49
(Australia) 2000 Sydney	6	0	0	0	0	–
(Greece) 2004 Athens	7	0	0	0	0	–
(China) 2008 Beijing	3	0	0	0	0	–
(United Kingdom) 2012 London	6	0	0	0	0	–
(Brazil) 2016 Rio de Janeiro	9	0	1	0	1	69
(Japan) 2020 Tokyo	6	0	0	0	0	–
(France) 2024 Paris	7	0	0	0	0	–
(United States) 2028 Los Angeles	future event					
(Australia) 2032 Brisbane	future event					
Total		1	1	0	2	111

=== Medals by sport ===
Sport	Gold	Silver	Bronze	Total
Athletics	1	1	0	2
Totals (1 entries)	1	1	0	2

== List of medalists ==
Medal	Name	Games	Sport	Event	Date
Gold	Vénuste Niyongabo	1996 Atlanta	Athletics	Men's 5000 metres	3 August 1996
Silver	Francine Niyonsaba	2016 Rio de Janeiro	Athletics	Women's 800 metres	20 August 2016

== See also ==
- List of flag bearers for Burundi at the Olympics
- Category:Olympic competitors for Burundi
- Burundi at the Paralympics
