= Burundi at the 2004 Summer Olympics =

- IOC code: BDI
- NOC: Burundi National Olympic Committee

in Athens
- Competitors: 7 in 2 sports
- Flag bearer: Emery Nziyunvira
- Medals: Gold 0 Silver 0 Bronze 0 Total 0

Summer Olympics appearances (overview)
- 1996; 2000; 2004; 2008; 2012; 2016; 2020; 2024

Burundi was represented at the 2004 Summer Olympics in Athens, Greece by the Burundi National Olympic Committee.

In total, seven athletes including five men and two women represented Burundi in two different sports including athletics and swimming.

== Competitors ==
In total, seven athletes represented Burundi at the 2004 Summer Olympics in Athens, Greece across two different sports.

Sport	Men	Women	Total
Athletics	4	1	5
Swimming	1	1	2
Total	5	2	7

== Athletics ==
In total, five Burundian athletes participated in the athletics events – Jean-Paul Gahimbaré and Joachim Nshimirimana in the men's marathon, Arthémon Hatungimana and Jean-Patrick Nduwimana in the men's 800 m and Francine Niyonizigiye in the women's 5,000 m.

The heats for the men's 800 m took place on 25 August 2004. Nduwimana finished third in his heat in a time of one minute 45.38 seconds and he advanced to the semi-finals as one of the fastest losers. Hatungimana finished fourth in his heat in a time of one minute 46.35 seconds and he did not advance to the semi-finals. The semi-finals took place the following day. Nduwimana finished fifth in his heat in a time of one minute 46.15 seconds and he did not advance to the final.

The men's marathon took place on 29 August 2004. Nshimirimana completed the course in a time of two hours 19 minutes 31 seconds to finish in 32nd place overall. Gahimbaré did not finish.

Athlete	Event	Heat		Semifinal		Final	
Athlete	Event	Result	Rank	Result	Rank	Result	Rank
Jean-Paul Gahimbaré	Marathon	—				DNF	
Arthémon Hatungimana	800 m	1:46.35	4	Did not advance			
Jean-Patrick Nduwimana	800 m	1:45.38	3 q	1:46.15	5	Did not advance	
Joachim Nshimirimana	Marathon	—				2:19:31	32

The heats for the women's 5,000 m took place on 20 August 2004. Niyonizigiye finished 19th in her heat in a time of 17 minutes 21.27 seconds and she did not advance to the final.

Athlete	Event	Heat		Final	
Athlete	Event	Result	Rank	Result	Rank
Francine Niyonizigiye	5,000 m	17:21.27	19	Did not advance	

== Swimming ==
In total, two Burundian athletes participated in the swimming events – Larissa Inangorore in the women's 100 m freestyle and Emery Nziyunvira in the men's 100 m freestyle.

The heats for the men's 100 m freestyle took place on 17 August 2004. Nziyunvira finished seventh in his heat in a time of one minute 9.4 seconds which was ultimately not fast enough to advance to the semi-finals.

Athlete	Event	Heat		Semifinal		Final	
Athlete	Event	Time	Rank	Time	Rank	Time	Rank
Emery Nziyunvira	100 m freestyle	54.40	69	Did not advance			

The heats for the women's 100 m freestyle took place on 18 August 2004. Inangorore finished second in her heat in a time of one minute 23.9 seconds which was ultimately not fast enough to advance to the semi-finals.

Athlete	Event	Heat		Semifinal		Final	
Athlete	Event	Time	Rank	Time	Rank	Time	Rank
Larissa Inangorore	100 m freestyle	1:23.90	49	Did not advance			
