= Niyongabo =

Niyongabo is a Burundian surname. Notable people with the surname include:

- Tharcisse Niyongabo, Burundian politician
- Vénuste Niyongabo (born 1973), Burundian former runner
- Yves Montand Niyongabo, Burundian-Rwandan film director
