= Burundi at the 1996 Summer Olympics =

- IOC code: BDI
- NOC: Comité National Olympique du Burundi

in Atlanta
- Competitors: 7 in 1 sport
- Flag bearer: Dieudonné Kwizéra
- Medals Ranked 49th: Gold 1 Silver 0 Bronze 0 Total 1

Summer Olympics appearances (overview)
- 1996; 2000; 2004; 2008; 2012; 2016; 2020; 2024

Burundi competed in the Olympic Games for the first time at the 1996 Summer Olympics in Atlanta, United States. The nation won its first Olympic gold medal in this debut appearance at the Games.

== Competitors ==
The following is the list of number of competitors in the Games.

Sport	Men	Women	Total
Athletics	6	1	7
Total	6	1	7

== Medalists ==
Medal	Name	Sport	Event	Date
Gold	Vénuste Niyongabo	Athletics	5000 m	3 August

== Results by event ==
=== Athletics ===
==== Men ====
Track and road events

Athletes	Events	Heat Round 1		Heat Round 2		Semifinal		Final	
Athletes	Events	Time	Rank	Time	Rank	Time	Rank	Time	Rank
Arthémon Hatungimana	800 metres	1:47.10	21 Q	N/A		1:44.92	9	Did not advance	
Charles Nkazamyampi	800 metres	1:47.95	35	N/A		Did not advance			
Dieudonné Kwizéra	1500 metres	3:41.45	33	N/A		Did not advance			
Vénuste Niyongabo	5000 metres	13:54.53	13 Q	N/A		14:03.48	11 Q	13:07.96	Gold medal
Aloÿs Nizigama	10,000 metres	27:53.21	3 Q	N/A				27:33.79	4
Tharcisse Gashaka	Marathon	N/A						2:32:55	90

==== Women ====
Track and road events

Athletes	Events	Heat Round 1		Heat Round 2		Semifinal		Final	
Athletes	Events	Time	Rank	Time	Rank	Time	Rank	Time	Rank
Justine Nahimana	10,000 metres	35:58.51	33	N/A				Did not advance	
