= Tharcisse =

Tharcisse is a given name. Notable people with the given name include:

- Tharcisse Gashaka (born 1962), Burundian athlete
- Tharcisse Karugarama, Rwandan lawyer and politician
- Tharcisse Niyongabo, Burundian politician
- Tharcisse Renzaho (born 1944), Rwandan soldier, former politician and war criminal
