= List of Burundian records in swimming =

The Burundian records in swimming are the fastest ever performances of swimmers from the Burundi, which are recognised and ratified by the Federation Burundaise de Natation.

All records were set in finals unless noted otherwise.

== Long Course (50 m) ==
=== Men ===
Event	Time		Name	Club	Date	Meet	Location	Ref
50 m freestyle	23.80	h	Belly-Cresus Ganira	Burundi	1 August 2024	Olympic Games	Paris, France	
100 m freestyle	53.84	b	Belly-Cresus Ganira	CN Antibes	29 March 2025	French Southern Region Spring Championships	Saint-Raphaël, France	
200 m freestyle	2:03.53	h	Belly-Cresus Ganira	Burundi	10 March 2024	African Games	Accra, Ghana	
400 m freestyle	4:28.02	h	Belly-Cresus Ganira	Burundi	11 March 2024	African Games	Accra, Ghana	
800 m freestyle	9:19.91		Belly-Cresus Ganira	Burundi	9 March 2024	African Games	Accra, Ghana	
1500 m freestyle	18:13.71		Belly-Cresus Ganira	Burundi	13 March 2024	African Games	Accra, Ghana	
50 m backstroke	30.58	h	Carel Van Melvin Irakoze	Burundi	10 October 2021	African Championships	Accra, Ghana	
100 m backstroke	1:07.39	h	Carel Van Melvin Irakoze	Burundi	15 October 2021	African Championships	Accra, Ghana	
200 m backstroke	2:30.83	h	Carel Van Melvin Irakoze	Burundi	13 October 2021	African Championships	Accra, Ghana	
50 m breaststroke	34.34	h	Carel Van Melvin Irakoze	Burundi	11 October 2021	African Championships	Accra, Ghana	
100 m breaststroke	1:14.88	h	Carel Van Melvin Irakoze	Burundi	10 October 2021	African Championships	Accra, Ghana	
200 m breaststroke	2:49.73	h	Carel Van Melvin Irakoze	Burundi	13 October 2021	African Championships	Accra, Ghana	
50 m butterfly	26.04	h	Belly-Cresus Ganira	CN Antibes	29 March 2025	French Southern Region Spring Championships	Saint-Raphaël, France	
100 m butterfly	57.88	h	Belly-Cresus Ganira	CN Antibes	28 March 2025	French Southern Region Spring Championships	Saint-Raphaël, France	
200 m butterfly								
200 m individual medley	2:31.96	h	Carel Van Melvin Irakoze	Burundi	16 October 2021	African Championships	Accra, Ghana	
400 m individual medley								
4×50 m freestyle relay	1:44.71			Burundi	19 October 2025	Africa Aquatics Zone III Championships	Nairobi, Kenya	
4×100 m freestyle relay	4:06.44			Burundi	October 2025	Africa Aquatics Zone III Championships	Nairobi, Kenya	
4×200 m freestyle relay								
4×100 m medley relay								

Legend: # – Record awaiting ratification by Burundi Swimming Federation; WR – World record; AF – African record;
Records not set in finals: h – heat; sf – semifinal; r – relay 1st leg; rh – relay heat 1st leg; b – B final; † – en route to final mark; tt – time trial

=== Women ===
Event	Time		Name	Club	Date	Meet	Location	Ref
50 m freestyle	29.73	h	Lois Irishura	Burundi	13 March 2024	African Games	Accra, Ghana	
100 m freestyle	1:05.37	h	Lois Irishura	Burundi	9 March 2024	African Games	Accra, Ghana	
200 m freestyle	2:28.99	h	Lois Irishura	Burundi	10 March 2024	African Games	Accra, Ghana	
400 m freestyle	5:29.06		Lois Irishura	Burundi	11 March 2024	African Games	Accra, Ghana	
800 m freestyle	11:30.00		Lois Irishura	Burundi	13 March 2024	African Games	Accra, Ghana	
1500 m freestyle	22:11.08		Lois Irishura	Burundi	9 March 2024	African Games	Accra, Ghana	
50 m backstroke	35.39	h	Lois Irishura	Burundi	11 March 2024	African Games	Accra, Ghana	
100 m backstroke	1:18.34	h	Lois Irishura	Burundi	12 March 2024	African Games	Accra, Ghana	
200 m backstroke								
50 m breaststroke	43.17		Alia Darcelle Ishimwe	Burundi	12 October 2021	African Junior Championships	Accra, Ghana	
100 m breaststroke								
200 m breaststroke								
50 m butterfly	34.48	h	Lois Irishura	Burundi	10 March 2024	African Games	Accra, Ghana	
100 m butterfly	1:28.32		Alyse Leilla Maniriho	Burundi	12 October 2021	African Junior Championships	Accra, Ghana	
200 m butterfly								
200 m individual medley	3:03.57		Alia Darcelle Ishimwe	Burundi	14 October 2021	African Junior Championships	Accra, Ghana	
400 m individual medley								
4×100 m freestyle relay								
4×200 m freestyle relay								
4×100 m medley relay								

Legend: # – Record awaiting ratification by Burundi Swimming Federation; WR – World record; AF – African record;
Records not set in finals: h – heat; sf – semifinal; r – relay 1st leg; rh – relay heat 1st leg; b – B final; † – en route to final mark; tt – time trial

=== Mixed relay ===
Event	Time	Name	Club	Date	Meet	Location	Ref
4×50 m freestyle relay	1:53.03		Burundi	17 October 2025	Africa Aquatics Zone III Championships	Nairobi, Kenya	
4×100 m freestyle relay	4:44.99	Tony Lilia Uwineza (1:03.62); Bayard T. Timoth Basogomba; Alia Darcelle Ishimwe; Alyse Leilla Maniriho	Burundi	11 October 2021	African Junior Championships	Accra, Ghana	
4×50 m medley relay	2:10.78		Burundi	17 October 2025	Africa Aquatics Zone III Championships	Nairobi, Kenya	
4×100 m medley relay							

Legend: # – Record awaiting ratification by Burundi Swimming Federation; WR – World record; AF – African record;
Records not set in finals: h – heat; sf – semifinal; r – relay 1st leg; rh – relay heat 1st leg; b – B final; † – en route to final mark; tt – time trial

== Short Course (25 m) ==
=== Men ===
Event	Time		Name	Club	Date	Meet	Location	Ref
50 m freestyle	24.22	h	Belly-Cresus Ganira	Burundi	18 December 2021	World Championships	Abu Dhabi, United Arab Emirates	
100 m freestyle	53.49	h	Carel Irakoze	Burundi	20 December 2021	World Championships	Abu Dhabi, United Arab Emirates	
200 m freestyle								
400 m freestyle								
800 m freestyle								
1500 m freestyle								
50 m backstroke	37.38	h	Idriss Mutankabandi	Burundi	5 December 2014	World Championships	Doha, Qatar	
100 m backstroke								
200 m backstroke								
50 m breaststroke	38.59	h	Billy-Scott Irakoze	Burundi	6 December 2014	World Championships	Doha, Qatar	
100 m breaststroke	1:17.56		Tony Uwineza	Burundi	25 November 2023	Africa Aquatics Zone III Championships	Kigali, Rwanda	
200 m breaststroke								
50 m butterfly	27.53	h, †	Belly-Cresus Ganira	Burundi	12 December 2018	World Championships	Hangzhou, China	
100 m butterfly	59.99	h	Belly-Cresus Ganira	Burundi	12 December 2018	World Championships	Hangzhou, China	
200 m butterfly								
100 m individual medley								
200 m individual medley								
400 m individual medley								
4×50 m freestyle relay								
4×100 m freestyle relay								
4×200 m freestyle relay								
4×50 m medley relay								
4×100 m medley relay								

Legend: # – Record awaiting ratification by Burundi Swimming Federation; WR – World record; AF – African record;
Records not set in finals: h – heat; sf – semifinal; r – relay 1st leg; rh – relay heat 1st leg; b – B final; † – en route to final mark; tt – time trial

=== Women ===
Event	Time		Name	Club	Date	Meet	Location	Ref
50 m freestyle	32.75	h	Alyse Maniriho	Burundi	20 December 2021	World Championships	Abu Dhabi, United Arab Emirates	
100 m freestyle	1:13.64	h	Elsie Uwamahoro	Burundi	4 December 2014	World Championships	Doha, Qatar	
200 m freestyle								
400 m freestyle								
800 m freestyle								
1500 m freestyle								
50 m backstroke								
100 m backstroke								
200 m backstroke								
50 m breaststroke								
100 m breaststroke								
200 m breaststroke								
50 m butterfly	38.97	h	Elsie Uwamahoro	Burundi	4 December 2014	World Championships	Doha, Qatar	
100 m butterfly								
200 m butterfly								
100 m individual medley								
200 m individual medley								
400 m individual medley								
4×50 m freestyle relay								
4×100 m freestyle relay								
4×200 m freestyle relay								
4×50 m medley relay								
4×100 m medley relay								

Legend: # – Record awaiting ratification by Burundi Swimming Federation; WR – World record; AF – African record;
Records not set in finals: h – heat; sf – semifinal; r – relay 1st leg; rh – relay heat 1st leg; b – B final; † – en route to final mark; tt – time trial
