= Burundi at the 2000 Summer Olympics =

- IOC code: BDI
- NOC: Comité National Olympique du Burundi

in Sydney
- Competitors: 6
- Flag bearer: Diane Nukuri
- Medals: Gold 0 Silver 0 Bronze 0 Total 0

Summer Olympics appearances (overview)
- 1996; 2000; 2004; 2008; 2012; 2016; 2020; 2024

Burundi competed at the 2000 Summer Olympics in Sydney, Australia.

== Competitors ==
The following is the list of number of competitors in the Games.

Sport	Men	Women	Total
Athletics	5	1	6
Total	5	1	6

== Athletics ==
Key

- Note – Ranks given for track events are within the athlete's heat only
- Q = Qualified for the next round
- q = Qualified for the next round as a fastest loser or, in field events, by position without achieving the qualifying target
- NR = National record
- N/A = Round not applicable for the event
- Bye = Athlete not required to compete in round

Men

Athlete	Event	Heat		Semifinal		Final	
Athlete	Event	Result	Rank	Result	Rank	Result	Rank
Arthémon Hatungimana	800 m	1:48.14	3	Did not advance			
Jean-Patrick Nduwimana	800 m	1:46.78	2 Q	1:46.98	6	Did not advance	
Vénuste Niyongabo	5000 m	13:49.57	15	Did not advance			
Aloÿs Nizigama	10000 m	27:50.09	8 Q	—N/a		27:44.56	9
Patrick Ndayisenga	marathon	—N/a				DNF	

Women

Athlete	Event	Heat		Final	
Athlete	Event	Result	Rank	Result	Rank
Diane Nukuri	5000 m	16:38.30	14	Did not advance	
