= 2016 IAAF World Indoor Championships – Women's 800 metres =

Women's 800 metres at the 2016 IAAF World Indoor Championships
- Venue: Oregon Convention Center
- Dates: March 19 (heats); March 20 (final)
- Competitors: 17 from 14 nations
- Winning time: 2:00.01

Medalists
gold medal	Francine Niyonsaba	Burundi
silver medal	Ajee' Wilson	United States
bronze medal	Margaret Nyairera Wambui	Kenya

Video on YouTube Official Video

The women's 800 metres at the 2016 IAAF World Indoor Championships took place on March 19 and 20, 2016.

Before the qualifying round here, Francine Niyonsaba had never run indoors. In the final, Ajee' Wilson took the lead at the break, with Margaret Nyairera Wambui following. Inexperienced at indoor strategy, Niyonsaba was in a frustrating position, blocked by the larger athletes ahead of her, boxed in, exchanging elbows with Habitam Alemu and Laura Roesler at her heels. On the second lap, Wambui got around Wilson to take the lead. Niyonsaba had had enough of this frustration, dropping behind Alemu then bouncing out to lane 2 running around the field into the lead, her third 200 so fast she opened up a 3-metre gap. From there, Niyonsaba simply held the gap all the way to the finish, with Wambui trying her hardest to make up the gap. Coming off the final turn, Wilson threw her best move against Wambui to outsprint her for silver.

== Results ==
=== Heats ===
Qualification: The winner of each heat (Q) and next 3 fastest (q) qualified for the final.

Rank	Heat	Name	Nationality	Time	Notes
1	1	Ajee' Wilson	United States	2:00.61	Q
2	1	Margaret Nyairera Wambui	Kenya	2:00.68	q, SB
3	1	Aníta Hinriksdóttir	Iceland	2:01.96	q
4	1	Habitam Alemu	Ethiopia	2:02.34	q
5	2	Francine Niyonsaba	Burundi	2:02.37	Q, NR
6	1	Anastasiia Tkachuk	Ukraine	2:02.60	
7	2	Lynsey Sharp	Great Britain	2:02.75	
8	2	Lovisa Lindh	Sweden	2:03.44	
9	2	Hedda Hynne	Norway	2:03.96	
10	2	Malika Akkaoui	Morocco	2:04.00	
11	3	Laura Roesler	United States	2:04.38	Q
12	3	Tigst Assefa	Ethiopia	2:04.55	
13	2	Līga Velvere	Latvia	2:05.20	
14	3	Christina Hering	Germany	2:05.39	
15	3	Adelle Tracey	Great Britain	2:07.05	
16	3	Rose Mary Almanza	Cuba	2:08.07	
17	3	Natoya Goule	Jamaica	2:08.23	

=== Final ===
The final was started on March 20 at 13:30.

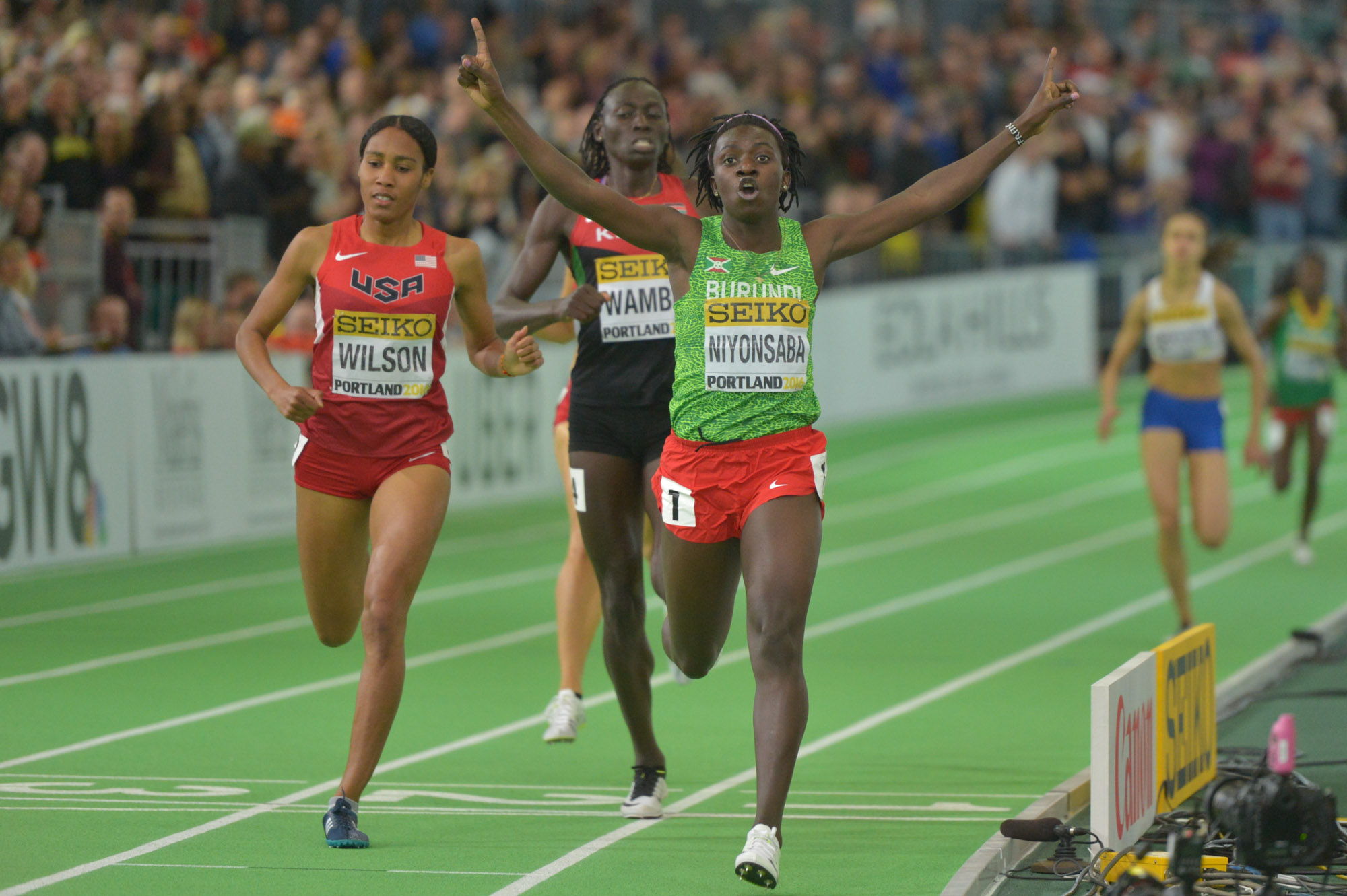
Finish of the final

Rank	Name	Nationality	Time	Notes
1st place, gold medalist(s)	Francine Niyonsaba	Burundi	2:00.01	WL
2nd place, silver medalist(s)	Ajee' Wilson	United States	2:00.27	
3rd place, bronze medalist(s)	Margaret Nyairera Wambui	Kenya	2:00.44	PB
4	Laura Roesler	United States	2:00.80	
5	Aníta Hinriksdóttir	Iceland	2:02.58	
6	Habitam Alemu	Ethiopia	2:04.61	
