= Burundi at the 2024 Summer Olympics =

- IOC code: BDI
- NOC: Burundi National Olympic Committee
- Website: www.bdiolympic.org

in Paris, France 26 July 2024 – 11 August 2024
- Competitors: 7 (4 men and 3 women) in 3 sports
- Flag bearers (opening): Belly-Cresus Ganira & Ange Ciella Niragira
- Flag bearer (closing): Ange Ciella Niragira
- Medals: Gold 0 Silver 0 Bronze 0 Total 0

Summer Olympics appearances (overview)
- 1996; 2000; 2004; 2008; 2012; 2016; 2020; 2024

Burundi competed at the 2024 Summer Olympics in Paris from 26 July to 11 August 2024. It was nation's eighth appearance at these games since their official debut at the 1996 Summer Olympics.

== Competitors ==
The following is the list of number of competitors in the Games.

| Sport | Men | Women | Total |
|---|---|---|---|
| Athletics | 3 | 1 | 4 |
| Judo | 0 | 1 | 1 |
| Swimming | 1 | 1 | 2 |
| Total | 4 | 3 | 7 |

== Athletics ==
Burundian track and field athletes achieved the entry standards for Paris 2024, either by passing the direct qualifying mark (or time for track and road races) or by world ranking, in the following events (a maximum of 3 athletes each).

Key

- Note–Ranks given for track events are within the athlete's heat only
- Q = Qualified for the next round
- q = Qualified for the next round as a fastest loser or, in field events, by position without achieving the qualifying target
- NR = National record
- N/A = Round not applicable for the event
- Bye = Athlete not required to compete in round

Track and road events

| Athlete | Event | Heat | | Final | |
| Athlete | Event | Time | Rank | Time | Rank |
|---|---|---|---|---|---|
| Egide Ntakarutimana | Men's 5000 m | 14:11.29 | 10 | Did not advance | |
| Rodrigue Kwizera | Men's 10000 m | — | | DNS | |
| Célestin Ndikumana | Men's 10000 m | — | | DNS | |
| Francine Niyomukunzi | Women's 5000 m | 15:01.42 | 5 Q | 15:22.40 | 16 |
| Francine Niyomukunzi | Women's 10000 m | — | | 31:17.02 PB | 14 |

== Judo ==
For the first time since 2016, Burundi qualified one judoka for the following weight class at the Games. Ange Niragira (women's heavyweight, 78 kg) got qualified via continental quota based on Olympic point rankings.

| Athlete | Event | Round of 32 | Round of 16 | Quarterfinals | Semifinals | Repechage | Final / BM | |
| Athlete | Event | Opposition Result | Opposition Result | Opposition Result | Opposition Result | Opposition Result | Opposition Result | Rank |
|---|---|---|---|---|---|---|---|---|
| Ange Ciella Niragira | Women's –78 kg | Pacut-Kloczko (POL); L 00–10 | Did not advance | | | | | |

== Swimming ==
Burundi sent two swimmers to compete at the 2024 Paris Olympics.

| Athlete | Event | Heat | | Semifinal | | Final | |
| Athlete | Event | Time | Rank | Time | Rank | Time | Rank |
|---|---|---|---|---|---|---|---|
| Belly-Cresus Ganira | Men's 50 m freestyle | 23.80 | 46 | Did not advance | | | |
| Lois Eliora Irishura | Women's 50 m freestyle | 29.63 | 58 | Did not advance | | | |

Qualifiers for the latter rounds (Q) of all events were decided on a time only basis, therefore positions shown are overall results versus competitors in all heats.
