= Athletics at the 2016 Summer Olympics – Women's 10,000 metres =

Women's 10,000 metres at the Games of the XXXI Olympiad
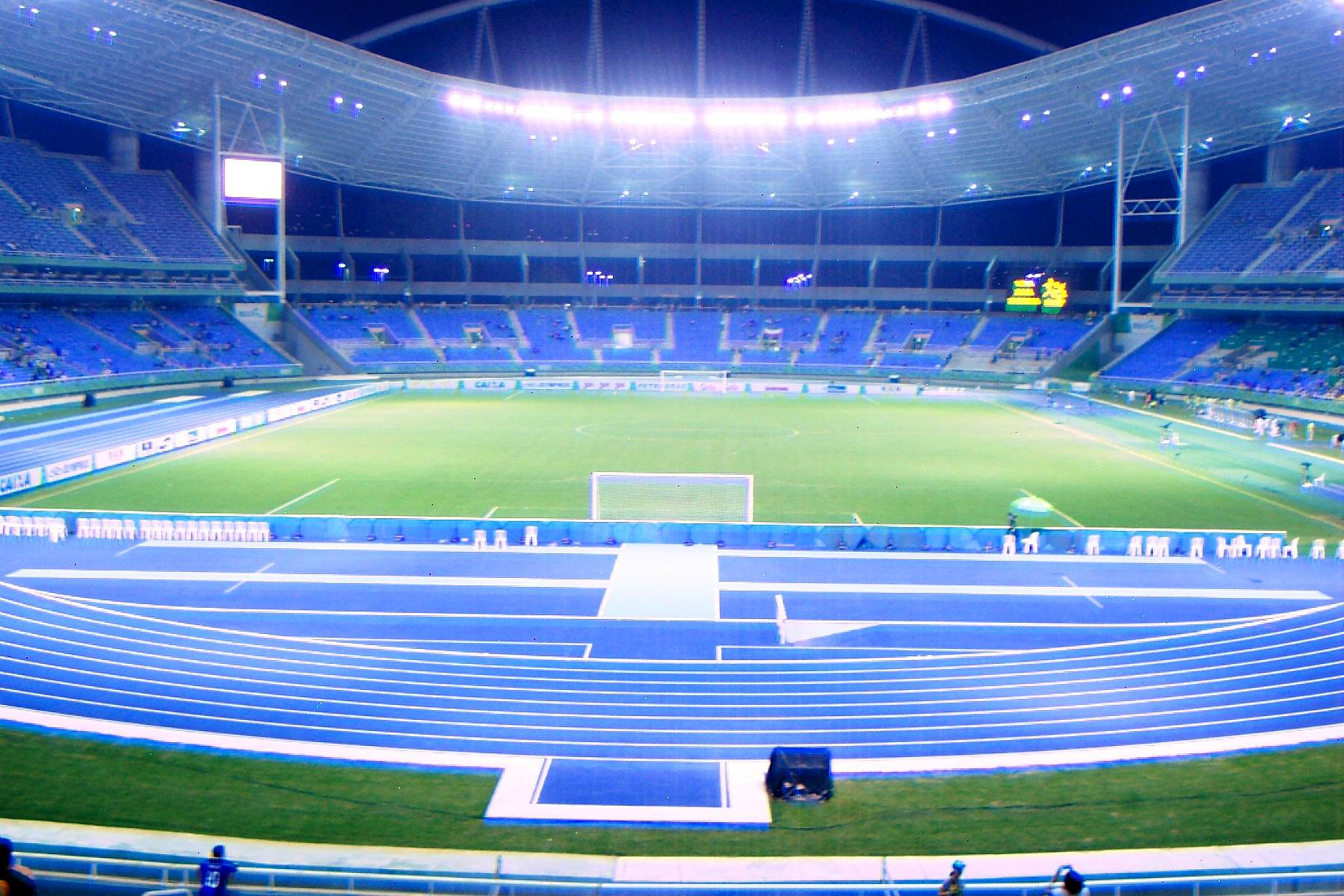
- Interior view of the Estádio Olímpico João Havelange, where the Women's 10,000m took place.
- Venue: Olympic Stadium
- Date: 12 August
- Competitors: 37 from 24 nations
- Winning time: 29:17.45 WR

Medalists
1st place, gold medalist(s)		Almaz Ayana	Ethiopia
2nd place, silver medalist(s)		Vivian Cheruiyot	Kenya
3rd place, bronze medalist(s)		Tirunesh Dibaba	Ethiopia

The women's 10,000 metres event at the 2016 Summer Olympics took place on 12 August at the Olympic Stadium. The gold medal was won by Ethiopian Almaz Ayana—in only her second 10,000 m race on the track—in a world record time of 29 minutes, 17.45 seconds. London 2012 bronze medallist Vivian Cheruiyot won silver for Kenya, with reigning Olympic champion Tirunesh Dibaba of Ethiopia taking bronze.

== Summary ==
Ethiopia's Tirunesh Dibaba entered as the defending 2012 Olympic champion and Vivian Cheruiyot of Kenya was the reigning 10,000 m World Champion at that point. However, it was Almaz Ayana who had the season-leading time of 30:07.00, the fastest time recorded in seven years for the distance and also her debut.

At the start of the race the 37-woman field was led by Alice Aprot Nawowuna of Kenya. Nawowuna quickly increased the pace, turning the group of runners into a single file, and after five laps the leading group was reduced to eight: three Kenyans (Nawowuna, Cheruiyot and Betsy Saina), three Ethiopians (Almaz Ayana, Tirunesh Dibaba and Gelete Burka), Kenyan ex-pat Yasemin Can of Turkey and Molly Huddle of the United States. The pace remained high from that point on, unusual for an international championship. Huddle was the first to fall away from the pack, followed by Gelete Burka. With twelve laps remaining, Almaz Ayana suddenly took the lead from Nawowuna, disrupting a leading group that had already begun to lap the race's slower runners.

Almaz Ayana continued the fast pace and even increased it, regularly running under 71 seconds per lap. Cheruiyot was the only other athlete near, though she was still some 15–20 metres behind. Almaz lapped all the runners from tenth downwards and completed the distance in 29:17.45, knocking 14 seconds off Wang Junxia's 22-year-old record (which itself had stood twenty-two seconds faster than any athlete before that point). Cheruiyot was runner-up and less than a second outside of the old world record. Defending champion Tirunesh Dibaba won the bronze with the fourth fastest time ever and Nawowuna was also under half an hour to record the fifth fastest time ever in fourth place.

In addition to Almaz Ayana's world and Olympic record time, a total of eight national records were broken at the competition. Molly Huddle's run of 30:13.17 in sixth place was the area record for the North, Central American and Caribbean region and number 17 of all time. In fifteenth place, just 5 weeks short of 43 years old, Jo Pavey set the Masters World Record at 31:33.44. Further down the field, only four of the top twenty athletes did not set personal bests.

The medals for the competition were presented by Mrs. Dagmawit Girmay Berhane, IOC member, and the gifts were presented by Lord Sebastian Coe, President of the International Association of Athletics Federations.

== Schedule ==
All times are Brasília Time (UTC−3).

Date	Time	Round
Friday, 12 August 2016	11:10	Finals

== Records ==
Prior to the competition, the existing World and Olympic records were as follows.

World record	Wang Junxia (CHN)	29:31.78	Beijing, China	8 September 1993
Olympic record	Tirunesh Dibaba (ETH)	29:54.66	Beijing, China	15 August 2008
2016 World leading	Almaz Ayana (ETH)	30:07.00	Hengelo, Netherlands	29 June 2016

The following records were established during the competition:

Date	Event	Name	Nationality	Time	Record
12 August	Final	Almaz Ayana	Ethiopia	29:17.45	WR

The following national records were established during the competition:

Country	Athlete	Round	Time	Notes
Ethiopia	Almaz Ayana (ETH)	Final	29:17.45	WR, OR, AR
Kenya	Vivian Cheruiyot (KEN)	Final	29:32.53	
United States	Molly Huddle (USA)	Final	30:13.17	AR
Sweden	Sarah Lahti (SWE)	Final	31:28.43	
Burundi	Diane Nukuri (BDI)	Final	31:28.69	
Greece	Alexi Pappas (GRE)	Final	31:36.16	
Kyrgyzstan	Darya Maslova (KGZ)	Final	31:36.90	
Uzbekistan	Sitora Hamidova (UZB)	Final	31:57.77	

== Results ==
=== Final ===
Rank	Name	Nationality	Time	Notes
1st place, gold medalist(s)	Almaz Ayana	Ethiopia	29:17.45	WR, OR, AR
2nd place, silver medalist(s)	Vivian Cheruiyot	Kenya	29:32.53	NR
3rd place, bronze medalist(s)	Tirunesh Dibaba	Ethiopia	29:42.56	PB
4	Alice Aprot Nawowuna	Kenya	29:53.51	PB
5	Betsy Saina	Kenya	30:07.78	PB
6	Molly Huddle	United States	30:13.17	AR
7	Yasemin Can	Turkey	30:26.41	PB
8	Gelete Burka	Ethiopia	30:26.66	PB
9	Karoline Bjerkeli Grøvdal	Norway	31:14.07	PB
10	Eloise Wellings	Australia	31:14.94	PB
11	Emily Infeld	United States	31:26.94	PB
12	Sarah Lahti	Sweden	31:28.43	NR
13	Diane Nukuri	Burundi	31:28.69	NR
14	Susan Kuijken	Netherlands	31:32.43	
15	Jo Pavey	Great Britain	31:33.44	SB, WMR
16	Jess Andrews	Great Britain	31:35.92	PB
17	Alexi Pappas	Greece	31:36.16	NR
18	Yuka Takashima	Japan	31:36.44	
19	Darya Maslova	Kyrgyzstan	31:36.90	NR
20	Hanami Sekine	Japan	31:44.44	
21	Dominique Scott	South Africa	31:51.47	PB
22	Natasha Wodak	Canada	31:53.14	SB
23	Alia Saeed Mohammed	United Arab Emirates	31:56.74	
24	Sitora Hamidova	Uzbekistan	31:57.77	NR
25	Lanni Marchant	Canada	32:04.21	SB
26	Carla Salomé Rocha	Portugal	32:06.05	
27	Salome Nyirarukundo	Rwanda	32:07.80	
28	Jip Vastenburg	Netherlands	32:08.92	
29	Trihas Gebre	Spain	32:09.67	SB
30	Veronica Inglese	Italy	32:11.67	
31	Tatiele de Carvalho	Brazil	32:38.21	
32	Brenda Flores	Mexico	32:39.08	SB
33	Marielle Hall	United States	32:39.32	
34	Beth Potter	Great Britain	33:04.34	
35	Marisol Romero	Mexico	35:33.03	
–	Ekaterina Tunguskova	Uzbekistan	DNF	
–	Juliet Chekwel	Uganda	DNF	
