= 2000 metres =

Track running event

Athletics 2000 metres

World records
- Men: Jakob Ingebrigtsen (NOR) 4:43.13 (2023)
- Women: Jessica Hull (AUS) 5:19.70 (2024)

Short track world records
- Men: Hobbs Kessler (USA) 4:48.79 (2026)
- Women: Genzebe Dibaba (ETH) 5:23.75 (2017)

The 2000 metres or 2000-metre run is a track running event where five laps are completed around an outdoor 400 m track, or ten laps around a 200 m indoor track - the distance is 11.68 meters short of 1¼ miles.

The global governing body World Athletics recognises official world records for the distance, and it is also recorded in continental and national record settings. The men's world record is held by Norway's Jakob Ingebrigtsen, who ran a time of 4:43.13 in 2023, while the women's world record is held by Australia's Jessica Hull, who ran a time of 5:19.70 in 2024.

The distance sparsely features on event programmes of professional one-day track and field meetings, serving as a comparatively novel event with greater scope for record-breaking performances. It is also used at lower-level competitions, such as school and youth tournaments. Since 2017, a 2000-metre run is one of the events held to test the fitness of potential draftees at the AFL Draft Combine.

Despite its world record status, it has not yet featured as a world championship level event indoors or outdoors; however, the event was briefly held at national level in the mid-1960s at the Spanish Indoor and Soviet Indoor Athletics Championships.

== Records ==
=== World records ===
- Correct as of 7 May 2026.

Division	Time	Athlete	Nation	Date	Place
Men	4:43.13	Jakob Ingebrigtsen	Norway	8 September 2023	Brussels
Women	5:19.70	Jessica Hull	Australia	12 July 2024	Monaco

=== Short track world bests ===
- Correct as of 7 May 2026.

Division	Time	Athlete	Nation	Date	Place
Men	4:48.79	Hobbs Kessler	United States	24 January 2026	Boston
Women	5:23.75	Genzebe Dibaba	Ethiopia	7 February 2017	Sabadell

=== Area records ===
- Updated 19 May 2026.

Area	Men			Women		
Area	Time	Season	Athlete	Time	Season	Athlete
Africa (records)	4:44.79	1999	Hicham El Guerrouj (MAR)	5:21.56	2021	Francine Niyonsaba (BDI)
Asia (records)	4:55.57	1995	Mohamed Suleiman (QAT)	5:29.41	1993	Wang Junxia (CHN)
Europe (records)	4:43.13 WR	2023	Jakob Ingebrigtsen (NOR)	5:25.36	1994	Sonia O'Sullivan (IRL)
North, Central America and Caribbean (records)	4:48.79 i	2026	Hobbs Kessler (USA)	5:28.78	2024	Cory McGee (USA)
North, Central America and Caribbean (records)	4:51.54	2023	Charles Philibert-Thiboutot (CAN)	5:28.78	2024	Cory McGee (USA)
Oceania (records)	4:48.77	2023	Stewart McSweyn (AUS)	5:19.70 WR	2024	Jessica Hull (AUS)
South America (records)	5:03.34	2002	Hudson de Souza (BRA)	5:50.21	2024	María Pía Fernández (URU)

== All-time top 25 ==
Tables show data for two definitions of "Top 25" - the top 25 2000 m times and the top 25 athletes:
- denotes top performance for athletes in the top 25 2000 m times
- denotes lesser performances, still in the top 25 2000 m times, by repeat athletes
- denotes top performance (only) for other top 25 athletes who fall outside the top 25 2000 m times

=== Men (outdoor) ===
- Correct as of January 2025.

Ath.#	Perf.#	Time	Athlete	Nation	Date	Place	Ref.
1	1	4:43.13	Jakob Ingebrigtsen	Norway	8 September 2023	Brussels	
2	2	4:44.79	Hicham El Guerrouj	Morocco	7 September 1999	Berlin	
3	3	4:46.88	Ali Saïdi-Sief	Algeria	19 June 2001	Strasbourg	
4	4	4:47.88	Noureddine Morceli	Algeria	3 July 1995	Paris	
5	5	4:48.14	Reynold Kipkorir Cheruiyot	Kenya	8 September 2023	Brussels	
	6	4:48.36	El Guerrouj #2		19 July 1998	Gateshead	
6	7	4:48.69	Vénuste Niyongabo	Burundi	12 July 1995	Nice	
7	8	4:48.74	John Kibowen	Kenya	1 August 1998	Hechtel	
8	9	4:48.77	Stewart McSweyn	Australia	8 September 2023	Brussels	
	10	4:49.00	Niyongabo #2		3 September 1997	Rieti	
	11	4:49.55	Morceli #2		10 July 1996	Nice	
9	12	4:49.68	Niels Laros	Netherlands	8 September 2023	Brussels	
10	13	4:49.85	Mario García	Spain	8 September 2023	Brussels	
	14	4:50.01	Ingebrigsten #2		11 June 2020	Oslo	
11	15	4:50.08	Noah Ngeny	Kenya	30 July 1999	Stockholm	
12	16	4:50.64	Narve Gilje Nordås	Norway	8 September 2023	Brussels	
13	17	4:50.68	Abel Kipsang	Kenya	8 September 2023	Brussels	
14	18	4:50.76	Craig Mottram	Australia	9 March 2006	Melbourne	
15	19	4:50.81	Saïd Aouita	Morocco	16 July 1987	Paris	
	20	4:51.17	El Guerrouj #3		31 August 2001	Berlin	
16	21	4:51.30	Daniel Komen	Kenya	5 June 1998	Milan	
17	22	4:51.39	Steve Cram	Great Britain	4 August 1985	Budapest	
18	23	4:51.52	John Walker	New Zealand	30 June 1976	Oslo	
19	24	4:51.54	Charles Philibert-Thiboutot	Canada	8 September 2023	Brussels	
20	25	4:52.20	Thomas Wessinghage	West Germany	31 August 1982	Ingelheim	
21		4:52.37	Ruben Verheyden	Belgium	8 September 2023	Brussels	
22		4:52.40	José Manuel Abascal	Spain	7 September 1986	Santander	
23		4:52.44	Jim Spivey	United States	15 September 1987	Lausanne	
24		4:52.53	Moses Kiptanui	Kenya	21 August 1992	Berlin	
25		4:52.82	Peter Elliott	Great Britain	15 September 1987	Lausanne	

=== Men (indoor) ===
- Correct as of January 2026.

Ath.#	Perf.#	Time	Athlete	Nation	Date	Place	Ref.
1	1	4:48.79	Hobbs Kessler	United States	24 January 2026	Boston	
2	2	4:49.48	Grant Fisher	United States	24 January 2026	Boston	
3	3	4:49.99	Kenenisa Bekele	Ethiopia	17 February 2007	Birmingham	
4	4	4:51.23	Lamecha Girma	Ethiopia	10 February 2024	Liévin	
5	5	4:52.41	Pieter Sisk	Belgium	24 January 2026	Boston	
6	6	4:52.86	Haile Gebrselassie	Ethiopia	15 February 1998	Birmingham	
7	7	4:52.90	Sergio Sánchez	Spain	23 January 2010	Oviedo	
8	8	4:52.92	Cole Hocker	United States	24 January 2026	Blacksburg	
9	9	4:53.69	Jake Wightman	Great Britain	24 January 2026	Boston	
10	10	4:54.07	Eamonn Coghlan	Ireland	20 February 1987	Inglewood	
11	11	4:54.08	Foster Malleck	Canada	24 January 2026	Boston	
12	12	4:54.74	Bernard Lagat	United States	15 February 2014	New York City	
12	12	4:54.74	Cooper Teare	United States	24 January 2026	Blacksburg	
14	14	4:54.76	Vénuste Niyongabo	Burundi	18 February 1996	Liévin	
15	15	4:55.35	Cameron Levins	Canada	15 February 2014	New York City	
16	16	4:55.54	Romain Mornet	France	24 January 2026	Boston	
17	17	4:55.72	Shadrack Korir	Kenya	17 February 2007	Birmingham	
18	18	4:56.09	Laban Rotich	Kenya	14 February 1999	Birmingham	
19	19	4:56.23	Jens-Peter Herold	Germany	6 March 1993	Karlsruhe	
20	20	4:56.30	Augustine Kiprono Choge	Kenya	9 February 2007	Aubiére	
21	21	4:56.40	Noah Ngeny	Kenya	25 February 2001	Liévin	
22	22	4:56.87	Andrés Manuel Díaz	Spain	14 February 1999	Birmingham	
23	23	4:56.99	David Torrence	United States	15 February 2014	New York City	
24	24	4:57.00	Samuel Zeleke	Ethiopia	17 February 2022	Liévin	
25	25	4:57.09	John Mayock	Great Britain	25 February 2001	Liévin	

=== Women (outdoor) ===
- Correct as of July 2024.

Ath.#	Perf.#	Time	Athlete	Nation	Date	Place	Ref.
1	1	5:19.70	Jessica Hull	Australia	12 July 2024	Monaco	
2	2	5:21.56	Francine Niyonsaba	Burundi	14 September 2021	Zagreb	
3	3	5:25.36	Sonia O'Sullivan	Ireland	8 July 1994	Edinburgh	
4	4	5:25.86	Freweyni Hailu	Ethiopia	14 September 2021	Zagreb	
5	5	5:26.08	Melissa Courtney-Bryant	Great Britain	12 July 2024	Monaco	
6	6	5:26.09	Edinah Jebitok	Kenya	12 July 2024	Monaco	
7	7	5:26.93	Yvonne Murray	Great Britain	8 July 1994	Edinburgh	
8	8	5:27.50	Genzebe Dibaba	Ethiopia	17 June 2014	Ostrava	
	9	5:27.73	Dibaba #2		19 June 2018	Montreuil	
9	10	5:28.69	Maricica Puică	Romania	11 July 1986	London	
10	11	5:28.72	Tatyana Kazankina	Soviet Union	4 August 1984	Moscow	
11	12	5:28.78	Cory McGee	United States	12 July 2024	Monaco	
12	13	5:28.82	Georgia Griffith	Australia	12 July 2024	Monaco	
	14	5:29.42	Dibaba #3		26 June 2014	Sollentuna	
	15	5:29.58	Murray #2		11 July 1986	London	
13	16	5:29.64	Tatyana Pozdnyakova	Soviet Union	4 August 1984	Moscow	
14	17	5:30.19	Zola Budd	Great Britain	11 July 1986	London	
14	17	5:30.19	Gelete Burka	Ethiopia	4 September 2009	Brussels	
	19	5:30.39	Puică #2		4 September 1985	Rieti	
16	20	5:30.92	Galina Zakharova	Soviet Union	4 August 1984	Moscow	
17	21	5:31.03	Gulnara Samitova-Galkina	Russia	27 May 2007	Sochi	
18	22	5:31.18	Lucia Stafford	Canada	12 July 2024	Monaco	
19	23	5:31.52	Vivian Cheruiyot	Kenya	7 June 2009	Eugene	
20	24	5:31.88	Maryam Yusuf Jamal	Bahrain	7 June 2009	Eugene	
21	25	5:32.40	Dawit Seyaum	Ethiopia	14 September 2021	Zagreb	
22		5:32.63	Agathe Guillemot	France	12 July 2024	Monaco	
23		5:32.7h	Mary Decker	United States	3 August 1984	Eugene	
24		5:32.83	Roberta Brunet	Italy	14 September 1996	Turin	
25		5:32.86	Marta García	Spain	12 July 2024	Monaco	

=== Women (indoor) ===
- Correct as of February 2026.

Ath.#	Perf.#	Time	Athlete	Nation	Date	Place	Ref.
1	1	5:23.75	Genzebe Dibaba	Ethiopia	7 February 2017	Sabadell	
2	2	5:26.68	Jessica Hull	Australia	19 February 2026	Liévin	
3	3	5:30.31	Salomé Afonso	Portugal	19 February 2026	Liévin	
4	4	5:30.53	Gabriela Szabo	Romania	8 March 1998	Sindelfingen	
5	5	5:32.18	Agathe Guillemot	France	19 February 2026	Liévin	
6	6	5:32.68	Lucia Stafford	Canada	19 February 2026	Liévin	
7	7	5:34.51	Kena Tufa	Ethiopia	19 February 2026	Liévin	
8	8	5:34.52	Mary Slaney	United States	18 January 1985	Los Angeles	
9	9	5:35.46	Dawit Seyaum	Ethiopia	7 February 2015	Boston	
10	10	5:35.78+	Gudaf Tsegay	Ethiopia	2 March 2024	Glasgow	
11	11	5:35.87	Revée Walcott-Nolan	Great Britain	19 February 2026	Liévin	
	12	5:35.99+	Hull #2		2 March 2024	Glasgow	
12	13	5:37.34	Fernanda Ribeiro	Portugal	28 February 1996	Valencia	
13	14	5:39.15	Yelena Kanales	Russia	7 January 2006	Yekaterinburg	
14	15	5:39.30	Olga Yegorova	Russia	13 February 2000	Liévin	
15	16	5:39.36	Violeta Beclea-Szekely	Romania	13 February 2000	Liévin	
16	17	5:39.47	Berhane Adere	Ethiopia	22 February 2002	Chemnitz	
17	18	5:40.26	Mariya Konovalova	Russia	7 January 2008	Yekaterinburg	
18	19	5:40.35	Sally Kipyego	Kenya	7 February 2015	Boston	
19	20	5:40.75	Yelena Soboleva	Russia	7 January 2006	Yekaterinburg	
20	21	5:40.86	Yvonne Murray	Great Britain	20 February 1993	Birmingham	
21	22	5:40.95	Yelena Zadorozhnaya	Russia	7 January 2008	Yekaterinburg	
22	23	5:41.10	Kim Conley	United States	8 February 2014	Boston	
22	23	5:41.10	Yelena Korobkina	Russia	7 January 2018	Yekaterinburg	
24	25	5:41.11	Emma Coburn	United States	7 February 2015	Boston	
25		5:42.12	Aleksandra Gulyayeva	Russia	7 January 2018	Yekaterinburg	
