= Athletics at the 2020 Summer Olympics – Women's 10,000 metres =

Women's 10,000 metres at the Games of the XXXII Olympiad
- Olympic Athletics
- Venue: Japan National Stadium
- Date: 7 August 2021 (final)
- Competitors: 29 from 18 nations
- Winning time: 29:55.32

Medalists
1st place, gold medalist(s)		Sifan Hassan	Netherlands
2nd place, silver medalist(s)		Kalkidan Gezahegne	Bahrain
3rd place, bronze medalist(s)		Letesenbet Gidey	Ethiopia

The women's 10,000 metres event at the 2020 Summer Olympics took place on 7 August 2021 at the Japan National Stadium. 29 athletes competed.

== Summary ==
At the Rio Olympics, Almaz Ayana beat a nearly 23 year old world record, which many had considered suspicious, to win the gold medal. Ayana's record lasted until June 6 of this year, when Sifan Hassan took over ten and a half seconds off while setting a new world record. Hassan's glory lasted two days until Letesenbet Gidey took another five and a half seconds out of Hassan's time and yet another new world record, 29:01.03. Both Hassan and Gidey were here, Hassan on the third leg of her unprecedented triple attempt. But the triple was not to be as Hassan's famous finish in the 1500m was broken, leaving her to struggle home for bronze. That race was only 22 hours before the 10,000 final. Gidey and most of the field were running on fresher legs. None of the Rio podium, including Ayana would return. Hassan and Gidey were also the gold and silver medalists, respectively, from the most recent World Championships. Hellen Obiri, who Hassan vanquished in the last 100m of the 5000 earlier in the week, was back for another go at Hassan. Another wild card in the race was Francine Niyonsaba, the Rio 800m silver medalist, pushed out of her favored event by the new testosterone regulations. If she were still in the mix, what kind of finishing speed could she muster?

In as much as 91% humidity, twenty nine athletes took to the track. There were qualifying standards, but no qualifying round to get into this race. As usual, Hassan dropped to last place, the early leader's role conceded to those who wanted it, which just like other distance races here turned to the home Japanese runners Ririka Hironaka and Hitomi Niiya. After 2 laps, Niiya dropped back and Tsigie Gebreselama stepped off the track, reducing the strength of the Ethiopian team. Hironaka paced the string of athletes almost 8 laps before being swallowed by a pack led by Gidey. About a dozen were able to stay with the pack, with Hassan comfortably nestled just ahead of others struggling to stay on the back. As Gidey sped up a little, the stragglers broke off. Within another faster lap, Hironaka and Niyonsaba were off the back, the pack was down to six, then five with half the race to go. As Irene Cheptai dropped off, the pack was down to Gidey, Obiri, Hassan and Kalkidan Gezahegne. With 8 laps to go, Obiri began to fade off the back. Unless something strange happened, the medalists were determined early. For seven laps, they stayed in close order, Gidey, Hassan and Gezahegne each separated by barely a metre. Occasionally Hassan would clip the heels of Gidey who looked back in anger. With 500 metres to go, Hassan stepped out to have running room around Gidey at any time. At the bell, Gidey accelerated, but Hassan stayed with her. Down the backstretch, Hassan moved closer, on Gidey's shoulder but never taking the lead. Through the final turn, Hassan waited for her moment. 125 metres to go, Hassan moved forward, leaned her shoulder inward as they were approaching a pack of lapped runners (Emily Sisson, Karissa Schweizer and Eilish McColgan). Hassan turned on the speed, Gidey was gone off the back. But Gezahegne remained persistent, chasing Hassan home. 50 metres from the finish, Hassan accelerated again just to make sure.

While Hassan didn't get the triple, she completed the second Women's Woolworth (5 and 10) double in the Olympics after Tirunesh Dibaba in 2008. While all three medalists have run faster, all of their times would place them among the top 13 women of all time.

== Background ==
This was the 9th time the event was held, having appeared at every Olympics since 1988.

== Qualification ==
A National Olympic Committee (NOC) could enter up to 3 qualified athletes in the women's 10,000 metres event if all athletes meet the entry standard or qualify by ranking during the qualifying period. (The limit of 3 has been in place since the 1930 Olympic Congress.) The qualifying standard is 31:25.00. This standard was "set for the sole purpose of qualifying athletes with exceptional performances unable to qualify through the IAAF World Rankings pathway." The world rankings, based on the average of the best five results for the athlete over the qualifying period and weighted by the importance of the meet, will then be used to qualify athletes until the cap of 27 is reached. Because more than 27 athletes (after applying the 3-per-NOC limit) have met the qualifying standard, the world rankings are not used.

The qualifying period was originally from 1 January 2019 to 29 June 2020. Due to the COVID-19 pandemic, the period was suspended from 6 April 2020 to 30 November 2020, with the end date extended to 29 June 2021. The qualifying time standards could be obtained in various meets during the given period that have the approval of the IAAF. Both indoor and outdoor meets were eligible for qualifying. The most recent Area Championships may be counted in the ranking, even if not during the qualifying period.

NOCs cannot use their universality place in the 10,000 metres.

== Competition format ==
The event consisted of a single race.

== Records ==
Prior to this competition, the existing global and area records were as follows.

World record	Letesenbet Gidey (ETH)	29:01.03	Hengelo, Netherlands	8 June 2021
Olympic record	Almaz Ayana (ETH)	29:17.45	Rio de Janeiro, Brazil	12 August 2016
World Leading	Letesenbet Gidey (ETH)	29:01.03	Hengelo, Netherlands	8 June 2021

Area
Area	Time (s)	Athlete	Nation
Africa (records)	29:01.03 WR	Letesenbet Gidey	Ethiopia
Asia (records)	29:31.78	Wang Junxia	China
North, Central America and Caribbean (records)	30:13.17	Molly Huddle	United States
Europe (records)	29:06.82	Sifan Hassan	Netherlands
Oceania (records)	30:35.54	Kim Smith	New Zealand
South America (records)	31:47.76	Carmem de Oliveira	Brazil

The following national records were established during the competition:

Country	Athlete	Round	Time	Notes
Burundi	Francine Niyonsaba (BDI)	Final	30:41.93	

== Schedule ==
All times are Japan Standard Time (UTC+9)

The women's 10,000 metres took place on a single day.

Date	Time	Round
Saturday, 7 August 2021	19:00	Final

=== Final ===
Rank	Athlete	Nation	Time	Notes
1st place, gold medalist(s)	Sifan Hassan	Netherlands	29:55.32	
2nd place, silver medalist(s)	Kalkidan Gezahegne	Bahrain	29:56.18	
3rd place, bronze medalist(s)	Letesenbet Gidey	Ethiopia	30:01.72	
4	Hellen Obiri	Kenya	30:24.27	PB
5	Francine Niyonsaba	Burundi	30:41.93	NR
6	Irene Chepet Cheptai	Kenya	30:44.00	PB
7	Ririka Hironaka	Japan	31:00.71	PB
8	Konstanze Klosterhalfen	Germany	31:01.97	
9	Eilish McColgan	Great Britain	31:04.46	
10	Emily Sisson	United States	31:09.58	
11	Yasemin Can	Turkey	31:10.05	SB
12	Karissa Schweizer	United States	31:19.96	
13	Alicia Monson	United States	31:21.36	
14	Andrea Seccafien	Canada	31:36.36	
15	Dolshi Tesfu	Eritrea	31:37.98	
16	Sheila Chelangat	Kenya	31:48.23	
17	Jessica Judd	Great Britain	31:56.80	
18	Meraf Bahta	Sweden	32:10.49 (32:10.483)	
19	Camille Buscomb	New Zealand	32:10.49 (32:10.489)	SB
20	Dominique Scott	South Africa	32:14.05	
21	Hitomi Niiya	Japan	32:23.87	SB
22	Yuka Ando	Japan	32:40.77	
23	Selamawit Teferi	Israel	32:46.46	
24	Mercyline Chelangat	Uganda	33:10.90	
	Sarah Lahti	Sweden	DNF	
	Karoline Bjerkeli Grøvdal	Norway	DNF	
	Susan Krumins	Netherlands	DNF	
	Tsigie Gebreselama	Ethiopia	DNF	
	Tsehay Gemechu	Ethiopia	DQ	TR 17.3.2
