= Ekaterina Tunguskova =

Uzbekistani long-distance runner

Ekaterina Tunguskova (born 10 May 1988) is an Uzbekistani long-distance runner. She competed at the 2016 Summer Olympics in the women's 10,000 metres race but did not finish the race.
