= Diane Nukuri =

Burundian-American long-distance runner

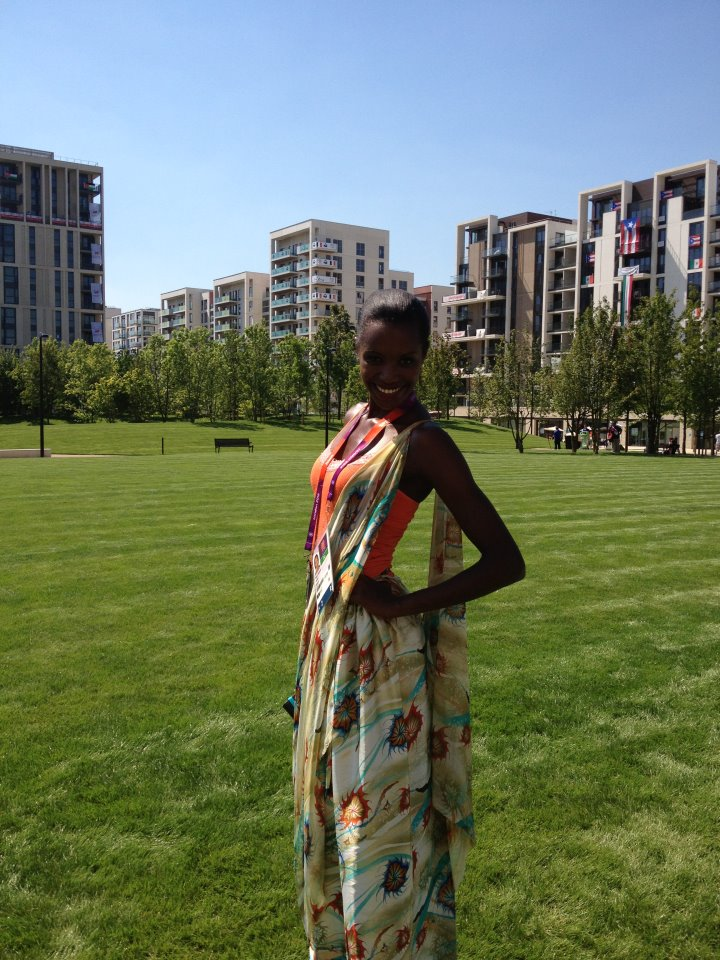
- Diane Nukuri at the 2012 Olympics "Burundi Day"

Personal information
- Born: 1 December 1984 (age 41) Kigozi, Burundi
- Height: 1.83 m (6 ft 0 in)
- Weight: 59 kg (130 lb)

Sport
- Country: Burundi; United States
- College team: Butler CC; Iowa

Achievements and titles
- Olympic finals: 2000; 5000 m, 45th (h); 2012; Marathon, 31st 2016; 10,000 m, 13th
- Personal bests: 5000 m: 15:59.39 (Palo Alto 2008); 10,000 m: 31:28.69 NR (Rio de Janeiro 2016); 5 km: 15:34 (Carlsbad 2016); 10 km: 31:49 (Manchester 2016); Half marathon: 69:12 NR (New York 2013); Marathon: 2:27:50 NR (London 2015)

Diane Nukuri (born 1 December 1984, in Kigozi-Mukike) is a Burundian-American professional distance runner. She competed for Burundi as a fifteen-year-old in the 2000 Summer Olympics in Sydney in the 5,000m and in the 2012 Summer Olympics in London in the marathon. Nukuri ran for the University of Iowa in college. She was the Burundian flag bearer at the Summer Olympics in 2000 and 2012.

== Early life ==
Nukuri began running in her early teens, starting little more than a year prior to her first Olympic experience (the 2000 Olympics in Sydney). She ran in the junior IAAF World Cross Country Championships twice, placing 18th in 2000 and 27th the following year. She won the bronze medal in the 10,000 meters at the 2001 Francophone Games in Ottawa, Ontario, Canada. After the games, Nukuri fled to Toronto, seeking asylum from the Burundi civil war. At the time, Nukuri had already lost her father to the conflict, and she knew she would have no running career had she stayed in Burundi. She was granted asylum, and lived with relatives in Pickering, Ontario, a suburb of Toronto.

== The University of Iowa and Butler CCC ==
Nukuri continued to run while living in Canada and began drawing interest from cross country and distance track coaches from American universities, in particular the University of Iowa. However, Nukuri spoke very little English, so she attended Butler County Community College in El Dorado, Kansas. At Butler, Nukuri trained under Kirk Hunter while learning English (her third language), taking classes, and amassing 9 NJCAA national championships and 17 NJCAA All-American honors. After two seasons at Butler, Nukuri transferred to the University of Iowa to work with coach Layne Anderson, who recruited Diane directly out of high school. Anderson was largely responsible for Nukuri attending Butler.

In her time at Iowa, Nukuri won two Big Ten Championships, in cross-country (2007) and the 5,000 meters in outdoor track (2008). She was named an All-American three times and won the Wilma Rudolph student-athlete award. She left Iowa with school records in ten events.

In her final collegiate race (the NCAA Championships, 10,000 meters), a major side stitch forced Nukuri into an early exit with only a few laps remaining while in second place. She graduated from Iowa with a bachelor's degree in communications in the fall of 2008.

== Professional career ==
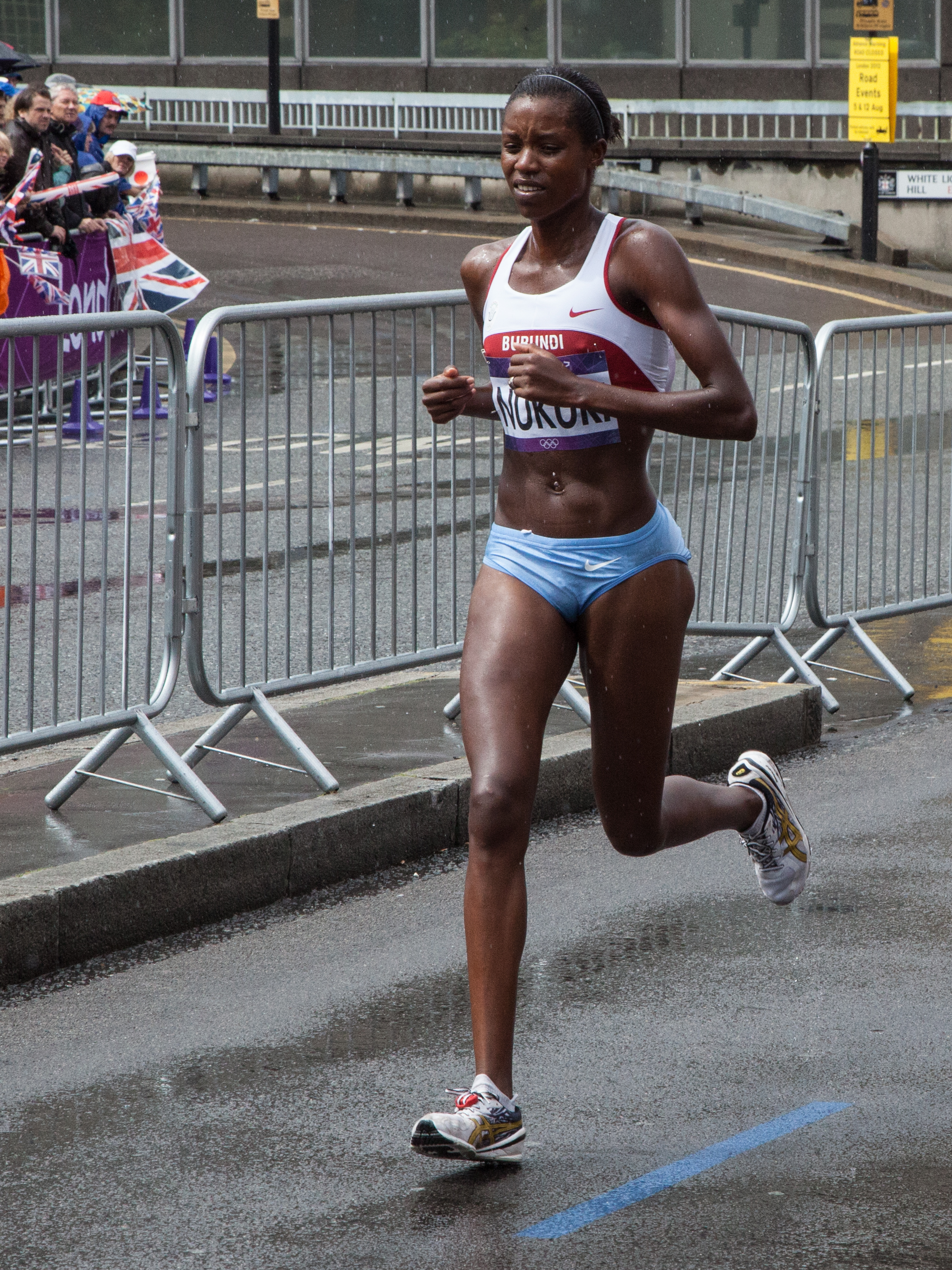
Diane Nukuri-Johnson in the Marathon at the 2012 Olympics in London

She competed in her first professional race at the 2008 Shelter Island 10K. Major race performances are below.

Nukuri first competed in the Olympics at the age of 15, running the 5,000 meters at the 2000 Summer Olympics in Sydney. She finished 14th in her heat but did not advance to the finals. She returned to the Olympics twelve years later, competing in the women's marathon. She finished in 31st place, setting another Burundian National Record (she owned the previous mark in the marathon) in 2:30:13. 118 runners started the race, and 107 finished. Nukuri was also the flag-bearer for Burundi, leading the country's six athletes at the opening ceremony. Nukuri also carried the flag in Sydney.

She bettered her national record at the NYC Half Marathon in March 2013, narrowly finishing second to Caroline Rotich in a time of 1:09:12 hours.

Nukuri is currently the Burundian record-holder in the 1,500 meters, 5,000 meters, 10,000 meters, half marathon, and the marathon. She continues training under Coach Anderson.

Her story has been documented in a number of articles, including Running Times in October 2012.

Diane Nukuri represented Burundi once again at the 2016 Olympic Games in Rio de Janeiro in August 2016, running the 10,000 meters.

She became a U.S. citizen in 2017. She holds dual citizenship from both Burundi and the United States. She became eligible to compete internationally for the United States in February 2020.

== International competitions ==
Year	Competition	Venue	Position	Event	Notes
1999	All-Africa Games	Johannesburg, South Africa	10th	5000 m	17:04.75
2000	World Cross Country Championships	Vilamoura, Portugal	18th	Junior race	21:42
2000	Olympic Games	Sydney, Australia	14th (h)	5000 m	16:38.30
2001	World Cross Country Championships	Ostend, Belgium	27th	Junior race	23:37
2001	Francophonie Games	Ottawa, Canada	3rd	10,000 m	34:30.66
2012	Olympic Games	London, United Kingdom	31st	Marathon	2:30:13 NR
2013	Francophonie Games	Nice, France	1st	10,000 m	32:29.14
2016	Olympic Games	Rio de Janeiro, Brazil	13th	10,000 m	31:28.69 NR

== Circuit results ==
=== Marathons ===
Year	Race	Time	Place
2017	New York City Marathon	2:31:21	9th
2017	Boston Marathon	2:32:24	9th
2014	Montreal Marathon	1:13:07	1st
2013	New York City Marathon	2:30:09	10th
2013	Boston Marathon	2:29:54	8th
2011	New York City Marathon	2:41:21	20th
2011	Los Angeles Marathon	2:33:47 NR	4th
2010	Chicago Marathon	2:39:09	23rd

=== Other distances ===
Year	Race	Time	Place
2018	Las Vegas Rock 'n' Roll Half Marathon	1:15:20	15th
2018	Lilac Bloomsday Run 12 km	41:32	11th
2018	Cherry Blossom 10 Miler	53:56	5th
2017	Beach to Beacon 10 km	32:10	5th
2017	Steamboat Classic 4 Mile	20:49	1st
2017	New York Half Marathon	1:09:13	3rd
2017	Houston Half Marathon	1:11:42	10th
2016	Steamboat Classic 4 Mile	20:29	1st
2016	New York Mini 10K	32:18	3rd
2016	Great Manchester Run 10K	31:49	3rd
2016	UAE Healthy Kidney 10K	32:23	4th
2016	Payton Jordan Invitational 10,000m	31:57.99	16th
2016	Boston Athletic Association 5K	15:43	4th
2016	Carlsbad 5000	15:34	4th
2016	New York City Half Marathon	1:09:41	3rd
2016	World's Best 10K	32:45	9th
2016	Marugame Half Marathon	1:09:23	2nd
2016	Rock 'n' Roll Arizona 10K	32:11	1st
2015	Falmouth Road Race	36:47	1st
2014	Bay to Breakers 12K	40:15	1st
2013	Bay to Breakers 12K	40:12	1st
2013	New York City Half Marathon	1:09:12	2nd
2012	Alliant Energy 8K	25:50	1st
2012	Steamboat Classic 4 Mile	20:28	2nd
2012	New York Mini 10K	32:38	4th
2012	Dam tot Damloop 20K	1:07:52 CR	1st
2012	Lilac Bloomsday Run 12K	40:01	5th
2012	Payton Jordan Invitational 10,000m	32:45.96	20th
2012	BAA 5K	15:41	5th
2012	Bank of America Shamrock Shuffle 8K	26:11	3rd
2012	New York City Half Marathon	1:10:55 NR	11th
2011	Philadelphia Rock 'n' Roll Half Marathon	1:12:08	6th
2011	Falmouth Road Race 7 Mile	37:13	2nd
2011	Beach to Beacon 10K	32:36.7 NR	4th
2011	Bix 7	37:59	3rd
2011	Fifth Season 8K, Cedar Rapids	26:07 NR	1st
2011	Steamboat Classic 4 Mile	20:41 NR	1st
2011	New York Mini 10K	33:28	12th
2011	Freihofer's Run for Women 5K	15:57 NR	6th
2011	Marion Arts Festival 5K	16:07	1st
2010	Philadelphia Rock 'n' Roll Half Marathon	74:20	12th
2010	Steamboat Classic 4 Mile	21:26	7th
2010	Drake Relays 8K	27:10	1st
2010	Carlsbad 5000	16:23	7th
2010	Meyo Indoor Meet 3000m	9:22.48	5th
2010	New Orleans Rock 'n' Roll Half Marathon	1:14:25	6th
2009	Manchester Road Race 4.75 Miles	26:05	7th
2009	Fifth Season 8K, Cedar Rapids	26:42	2nd
2008	Manchester Road Race 4.75 Miles	25:17	3rd
2008	Outdoor Big 10 Championships 5000m	16:24.21	1st
2008	NCAA Women's Division I Indoor Track and Field Championships 5000 m	16:35.05	12th
2007	NCAA Cross Country Championships	20:07	4th
2007	Big 10 Championships Cross Country 6K	19:37	1st
2007	NCAA Women's Division I Outdoor Track and Field Championships 10,000m	33:30.29	7th

== See also ==
- Burundi at the 2000 Summer Olympics
- National records in the marathon
- 2000 Summer Olympics national flag bearers
- 2012 Summer Olympics closing ceremony flag bearers
- Burundi at the 2016 Summer Olympics

Olympic Games
Preceded by Dieudonné Kwizera; Francine Niyonizigiye	Flagbearer for Burundi; 2000 Sydney; 2012 London	Succeeded by Emery Nziyunvira; Olivier Irabaruta
