= List of Burundian records in athletics =

The following are the national records in athletics in Burundi maintained by Burundi's national athletics federation: Fédération d'Athlétisme du Burundi (FAB).

== Outdoor ==
Key to tables: Awaiting ratification Record not kept by FAB Not ratified or later rescinded by FAB

=== Men ===
Event	Record	Athlete	Date	Meet	Place	Ref.
100 m	10.84	Kassiem Ntahimpera	13 July 1989	Jeux de la Francophonie	Casablanca, Morocco	
200 m	21.88	Kassiem Ntahimpéra	16 July 1989	Jeux de la Francophonie	Casablanca, Morocco	
400 m	46.32	Jean-Patrick Nduwimana	20 March 1999		Tucson, United States	
600 m	1:15.14	Jean-Patrick Nduwimana	3 August 2004		Liège, Belgium	
800 m	1:42.81	Jean-Patrick Nduwimana	17 August 2001	Weltklasse Zürich	Zürich, Switzerland	
1000 m	2:15.48	Arthémon Hatungimana	12 July 1995		Nice, France	
1500 m	3:29.18	Vénuste Niyongabo	22 August 1997	Memorial Van Damme	Brussels, Belgium	
Mile	3:46.70	Vénuste Niyongabo	26 August 1997	ISTAF	Berlin, Germany	
2000 m	4:48.69	Vénuste Niyongabo	12 July 1995		Nice, France	
3000 m	7:25.93	Thierry Ndikumwenayo (Note: Burundi until 16 April 2023 – eligible to represent Spain in national representative competitions from 17 April 2023)	10 August 2022	Herculis	Fontvieille, Monaco	
5000 m	12:46.73	Egide Ntakarutimana	5 September 2026	Memorial van Damme	Brussels, Belgium	
5 km (road)	13:11	Rodrigue Kwizera	29 April 2023	Adizero Road to Records	Herzogenaurach, Germany	
10,000 m	27:20.38	Aloÿs Nizigama	7 July 1995	London Grand Prix	London, United Kingdom	
10 km (road)	26:54	Rodrigue Kwizera	26 April 2025	Adizero: Road to Records	Herzogenaurach, Germany	
15 km (road)	41:45+	Rodrigue Kwizera	28 March 2026	Prague Half Marathon	Prague, Czech Republic	
15 km (road)	41:32+	Rodrigue Kwizera (Note: Spanish citizenship by official result source)	25 October 2026	Valencia Half Marathon	Valencia, Spain	
20 km (road)	59:18	Bernard Mvuyekere	16 October 1994		Paris, France	
20 km (road)	55:12+	Rodrigue Kwizera (Note: Spanish citizenship by official result source)	25 October 2026	Valencia Half Marathon	Valencia, Spain	
One hour	20354 m	Aloÿs Nizigama	2 June 2002		Hengelo, Netherlands	
Half marathon	58:16	Rodrigue Kwizera	28 March 2026	Prague Half Marathon	Prague, Czech Republic	
Half marathon	58:03	Rodrigue Kwizera (Note: Spanish citizenship by official result source)	25 October 2026	Valencia Half Marathon	Valencia, Spain	
25 km (road)	1:16:59+	Olivier Irabaruta	4 November 2018	Porto Marathon	Porto, Portugal	
30 km (road)	1:32:35+	Olivier Irabaruta	4 November 2018	Porto Marathon	Porto, Portugal	
Marathon	2:07:13	Olivier Irabaruta	10 April 2022	Zürich Marathon	Zürich, Switzerland	
110 m hurdles	14.63	Joseph Niyonkuru	11 August 1987	All-Africa Games	Nairobi, Kenya	
400 m hurdles	53.99	Christophe Bigirimana	23 September 1991	All-Africa Games	Cairo, Egypt	
3000 m steeplechase	8:36.19	Hilaire Ntirampeba	12 July 1994	Jeux de la Francophonie	Bondoufle, France	
High jump	2.05 m	Jérôme Rutayisiré	17 August 1986		Gauvain	
Pole vault	4.10 m	Pierre Ntibarashirwa	19 September 1979		Bujumbura, Burundi	
Pole vault	4.10 m	Venant Rwamahéké	1981		Bujumbura, Burundi	
Long jump	7.14 m	Christophe Ntirandékura	23 September 1991	All-Africa Games	Cairo, Egypt	
Triple jump	15.70 m	Christophe Ntirandékura	27 July 1991		Bujumbura, Burundi	
Shot put	13.24 m	Nelly Claude Nsengiyumva	5/7 September 2014	Burundian Championships	Ngozi, Burundi	
Discus throw	41.93 m	Domitien Nsabimana	31 July 1988		Bujumbura, Burundi	
Hammer throw						
Javelin throw	61.95 m	Joseph Kanjobi	9 June 1992		Bujumbura, Burundi	
Decathlon	5320 pts h	Jérôme Rutayisiré	23–24 August 1986		Woluwe, Belgium	
Decathlon	100m (wind) / Long jump (wind) / Shot put / High jump / 400m / 110m H (wind) / Discus / Pole vault / Javelin / 1500m; 12.2 / 6.21 m / 7.64 m / 1.92 m / 53.6 / 16.5 / 19.68 m / 2.65 m / 36.20 m / 4:19.5					
20 km walk (road)						
50 km walk (road)						
4 × 100 m relay	42.32	Burundi; Joseph Niyonkuru; A. Sindayigaya; Kassiem Ntahimpera; L. Surwingana	1 September 1988	African Championships	Annaba, Algeria	
4 × 400 m relay	3:06.19	Burundi; P.C. Nyabenda; C. Rugerinyange; A. Nsazurwimo; Dieudonné Kwizera	11 August 1987	All-Africa Games	Nairobi, Kenya	

=== Women ===
Event	Record	Athlete	Date	Meet	Place	Ref.
100 m	12.73	Françoise Bucumi	22 September 1991	All-Africa Games	Cairo, Egypt	
200 m	26.50	Phydia Inamahoro	25 June 1993	African Championships	Durban, South Africa	
400 m	54.3 h	Francine Niyonsaba	23 March 2013		Bujumbura, Burundi	
600 m	1:23.18	Francine Niyonsaba	27 August 2017	ISTAF Berlin	Berlin, Germany	
800 m	1:55.47	Francine Niyonsaba	21 July 2017	Herculis	Fontvieille, Monaco	
1500 m	4:20.95	Diane Nukuri	17 March 2007		San Diego, United States	
2000 m	5:21.56	Francine Niyonsaba	14 September 2021	Hanžeković Memorial	Zagreb, Croatia	
3000 m	8:19.08	Francine Niyonsaba	28 August 2021	Meeting de Paris	Paris, France	
Two miles	8:59.08	Francine Niyonsaba	27 May 2022	Prefontaine Classic	Eugene, United States	
5000 m	14:25.34	Francine Niyonsaba	3 September 2021	Memorial Van Damme	Brussels, Belgium	
5 km (road)	15:07+ Mx	Francine Niyomukunzi	14 January 2024	10K Valencia Ibercaja	Valencia, Spain	
5 km (road)	15:23 Wo	Francine Niyomukunzi	1 October 2023	World Road Running Championships	Riga, Latvia	
10,000 m	30:41.93	Francine Niyonsaba	7 August 2021	Olympic Games	Tokyo, Japan	
10 km (road)	30:42 Mx	Francine Niyomukunzi	14 January 2024	10K Valencia Ibercaja	Valencia, Spain	
15 km (road)	49:26+	Diane Nukuri	17 March 2013	New York City Half Marathon	New York City, United States	
20 km (road)	1:05:37+	Diane Nukuri	17 March 2013	New York City Half Marathon	New York City, United States	
Half marathon	1:09:12	Diane Nukuri	17 March 2013	New York City Half Marathon	New York City, United States	
25 km (road)	1:25:32+	Diane Nukuri-Johnson	26 April 2015	London Marathon	London, United Kingdom	
30 km (road)	1:42:38+	Diane Nukuri-Johnson	26 April 2015	London Marathon	London, United Kingdom	
Marathon	2:27:50	Diane Nukuri-Johnson	26 April 2015	London Marathon	London, United Kingdom	
100 m hurdles						
400 m hurdles						
3000 m steeplechase	11:28.83	Spéciose Gakobwa	19 June 2010		Saint-Renan, France	
High jump	1.55 m	Niyonsaba	15 March 1987		Bururi, Burundi	
Pole vault	3.70 m	Laetitia Berthier	29 June 2007		Feyzin, France	
Pole vault	3.70 m	Laetitia Berthier	1 May 2008	African Championships	Addis Ababa, Ethiopia	
Pole vault	3.70 m	Laetitia Berthier	13 June 2008		Pierre-Bénite, France	
Pole vault	3.70 m	Laetitia Berthier	14 June 2008		Annecy, France	
Pole vault	3.70 m	Laetitia Berthier	28 June 2008		Vénissieux, France	
Long jump	5.10 m	Dévote Barajenguye	1981		Bujumbura, Burundi	
Triple jump	10.89 m	Amissa Noëlla	21 August 2015		Butare, Rwanda	
Shot put	12.56 m	Tsizéyimana	23 August 1992		Bujumbura, Burundi	
Discus throw	30.82 m	Niyongéko	10 May 1991		Bujumbura, Burundi	
Hammer throw						
Javelin throw	19.66 m	Françoise Nijimbere	5 June 2004		Le Havre, France	
Heptathlon						
Heptathlon	100m H (wind) / High jump / Shot put / 200m (wind) / Long jump (wind) / Javelin / 800m					
20 km walk (road)						
50 km walk (road)						
4 × 100 m relay	51.8 h	Burundi	16 May 1993		Bujumbura, Burundi	
4 × 400 m relay	4:11.4 h	Burundi	23 August 1992		Bujumbura, Burundi	

== Indoor ==
=== Men ===
Event	Record	Athlete	Date	Meet	Place	Ref.
60 m	7.32	Espoir Rushimisha	1 February 2020		Bollnäs, Sweden	
200 m						
400 m	47.83 A OT	Jean-Patrick Nduwimana	7 February 2004		Flagstaff, United States	
800 m	1:45.33	Jean-Patrick Nduwimana	10 March 2001	NCAA Division I Championships	Fayetteville, United States	
1000 m	2:15.62	Vénuste Niyongabo	27 February 1995	XL Galan	Stockholm, Sweden	
1500 m	3:33.17	Vénuste Niyongabo	22 February 1998		Liévin, France	
2000 m	4:54.76	Vénuste Niyongabo	18 February 1996	Meeting Pas de Calais	Liévin, France	
3000 m	7:37.82	Vénuste Niyongabo	25 February 1995	Aviva Indoor Grand Prix	Birmingham, United Kingdom	
5000 m	13:46.27	Alfred Rugema	26 January 2001	Razorback Invitational	Fayetteville, United States	
60 m hurdles						
High jump						
Pole vault						
Long jump						
Triple jump						
Shot put						
Heptathlon						
Heptathlon	60m / Long jump / Shot put / High jump / 60m H / Pole vault / 1000m					
5000 m walk						
4 × 400 m relay						

=== Women ===
Event	Record	Athlete	Date	Meet	Place	Ref.
60 m	8.67	Claudine Kamariza	15 December 2001		Montreal, Canada	
200 m	28.57	Claudine Kamariza	1 March 2002		Montreal, Canada	
400 m	1:01.36	Claudine Kamariza	1 March 2002		Montreal, Canada	
800 m	1:58.31	Francine Niyonsaba	4 March 2018	World Championships	Birmingham, United Kingdom	
1500 m	4:31.42	Spéciose Gakobwa	18 January 2003		Mondeville, France	
3000 m	9:24.25	Diane Nukuri	26 January 2008		Minneapolis, United States	
3000 m	9:18.95 OT	Diane Nukuri	12 February 2011		Ames, United States	
5000 m	16:02.96	Diane Nukuri	2 March 2008		Minneapolis, United States	
5000 m	15:41.75 OT	Diane Nukuri	9 February 2013	Iowa State Classic	Ames, United States	
60 m hurdles						
High jump						
Pole vault	3.71 m	Laetitia Berthier	9 February 2008		Épinal, France	
Long jump	4.18 m	Francoise Nijimbere	11 January 2004		Eaubonne, France	
Triple jump						
Shot put						
Pentathlon						
Pentathlon	60m H / High jump / Shot put / Long jump / 800m					
3000 m walk						
4 × 400 m relay						
