= Steamboat Classic =

Running race in Peoria, Illinois

- Status: Active
- Venue: Adams and Main streets, Downtown
- Location: Peoria, Illinois
- Inaugurated: August 3, 1974; 52 years ago
- Founder: Illinois Valley Striders
- Previous event: June 17, 2023
- Attendance: 1,100 (2019)

The Steamboat Classic is a running race featuring 4 mile and 15K events in Peoria, Illinois. In 2019, the race drew about 1100 participants. The four-mile race has been described as the world's fastest. The world best times for both men and women, have been set at the Steamboat Classic.

== History ==
The Illinois Valley Striders (IVS) created the Steamboat Classic in 1974. The first race was held on August 3, 1974. 176 runners raced from downtown to Glen Oak Park and back.

The race took a hiatus in 2020 due to the COVID-19 pandemic.

== Route ==
The race is open to all levels of ability and all ages; runners, walkers, and joggers all participate.

The route for the USATF Certified 4 mile race is a flat course through the downtown streets of Peoria. It is often referred to as "one of the world’s fastest 4 mile races."

The 15K routes through hilly loops in Glen Oak Park. It is known as Illinois' toughest 15k.

The event also includes a 1 mile Fun Run/Walk.

== Champions ==
In 1995, Josphat Machuka of Kenya set the unofficial world four-mile road record with a time of 17:28.

=== Men's 4-mile champions ===
Men's Champions
Year	Name	Country	Time
2025	Alex Maier	USA	18:03
2024	Taggart Vanetten	USA	20:04
2023	Max Mcdaniel	USA	20:00
2022	Tyler Owens	USA	20:17
2021	Robert Murphy	USA	20:19
2020	No race		
2019	Jeffrey Eggleston	USA	19:15
2018	Alec Olson	USA	19:57
2017	Tommy Curtin	USA	18:08
2016	Johnny Crain	USA	18:25
2015	Moses Kipkosgei	KEN	18:19
2014	Sean Quigly	USA	18:08
2013	Shadrack Kosgei	KEN	18:09
2012	Sahdrack Kosgei	KEN	18:01
2011	Kevin Chelimo	KEN	18:02
2010	Shadrack Kosgei	KEN	17:36
2009	Riduoane Harroufi	MOR	17:44
2008	Riduoane Harroufi	MOR	18:17
2007	John Korir	KEN	17:53
2006	John Korir	KEN	18:16
2005	Shadrack Kosgei	KEN	17:45
2004	Luke Kipkosgei	KEN	17:36
2003	Shadrack Kosgei	KEN	17:34
2002	Tim Broe	USA	17:47
2001	Shadrack Hoff	RSA	17:45
2000	Jon Brown	ENG	18:16
1999	Khalid Khannouchi	MOR	17:52
1998	Khalid Khannouchi	MOR	17:30
1997	Khalid Khannouchi	MOR	17:42
1996	Philemon Hanneck	ZIM	17:41
1995	Josphat Machuka	KEN	17:24
1994	Lameck Aguta	KEN	17:43
1993	Martin Pitayo	MEX	17:53
1992	Rodney DeHaven	USA	17:59
1991	Mauricio Gonzalez	MEX	18:07
1990	Rodney DeHaven	USA	17:59
1989	Andrew Lloyd	AUS	17:58
1988	Joseph Kipsang	KEN	17:58
1987	Yobes Ondeki	KEN	17:54
1986	Arturo Barrios	MEX	17:34
1985	Phil Coppess	USA	18:26
1984	Martyn Brewer	USA	18:27
1983	John Wellerding	USA	18:20
1982	Pete ffitch	USA	18:51
1981	Glenn Herold	USA	18:53
1980	Dave Irion	USA	19:07
1979	Dave Hoover	USA	19:40
1978	Dan Dwyer	USA	19:22
1977	Paul Heck	USA	19:40
1976	Paul Heck	USA	19:31
1975	Michael Kelly	USA	20:04
1974	Dave Hoover	USA	20:48

=== Women's 4-mile champions ===
In 1995, Delillah Asiago of Kenya set the women's unofficial world four-mile road record with a time of 19:28.

Women's Champions
Year	Name	Country	Time
2025	Taylor Roe	USA	19:40
2024	Natalie Bierbaum	USA	22:19
2023	Nicole Benson	USA	23:54
2022	Stephanie Brown Brokaw	USA	22:32
2021	Ericka Waterman	USA	22:29
2020	No race		
2019	Jane Bareikis	USA	22:25
2018	Jenelle Deatherage	USA	20:43
2017	Diane Nukuri	BUR	20:49
2016	Diane Nukuri	BUR	20:29
2015	Sarah Boyle	USA	20:51
2014	Cynthia Lemo	KEN	20:00
2013	Risper Gezabwa	KEN	20:42
2012	Risper Gezabwa	KEN	20:26
2011	Diane Nukuri	BUR	20:41
2010	Edna Kiplagat	KEN	19:56
2009	Kim Smith	NZL	19:38
2008	Kim Smith	NZL	20:00
2007	Rehima Kedir	ETH	20:26
2006	Lornah Kiplagat	NED	19:43
2005	Constantina Tomescu-Dita	ROM	20:47
2004	Yasuko Hashimoto	JPN	20:40
2003	Constantina Tomescu-Dita	ROM	20:15
2002	Colleen DeReuck	USA	19:59
2001	Lornah Kiplagat	KEN	19:33
2000	Colleen deReuck	RSA	20:05
1999	Colleen deReuck	RSA	20:10
1998	Colleen deReuck	RSA	20:12
1997	Colleen deReuck	RSA	19:55
1996	Joyce Chepchumba	KEN	19:58
1995	Delillah Asiago	KEN	19:28
1994	Jane Omoro	KEN	20:31
1993	Carolyn Schuwalow	AUS	20:21
1992	Olga Appell	MEX	20:14
1991	Wanda Panfil	POL	20:28
1990	Susan Lee	CAN	20:10
1989	Chris Pfitzinger	NZL	20:37
1988	Francie Larrieu	USA	20:11
1987	Lorraine Moller	NZL	20:16
1986	Lorraine Moller	NZL	20:24
1985	Priscilla Welch	ENG	21:14
1984	Suzanne Tuffy	USA	21:31
1983	Wendy Van Mierlo	CAN	21:04
1982	Chris Reid	USA	21:31
1981	Beverly Enslow	USA	22:12
1980	Janae Hunzicker	USA	25:29
1979	Jan Ensrud	USA	22:54
1978	Beverly Enslow	USA	24:08
1977	Beverly Enslow	USA	23:36
1976	Carol Cook	USA	22:47
1975	Carol Cook	USA	22:52
1974	Carol Cook	USA	24:13

== Steamboat Classic Hall of Fame ==
The Steamboat Classic Hall of Fame was created in 1998 to coincide with the 25th anniversary of the race.

Steamboat Classic Hall of Fame Inductees
Year	Inductee(s)
1998	Arturo Barrios Beverly Enslow Lorraine Moller Steve Shostrom Priscilla Welch
1999	Carol Cook Tim Donovan
2000	Ed McGraw Mark Plaatjes
2001	Rod DeHaven Colleen DeReuck
2002	Joyce Chepchumba Glenn Herold
2003	Khalid Khannouchi Jerry Kokesh
2004	Hon. James Maloof Suzanne Tuffey
2005	Martyn Brewer Wanda Panfil
2006	Paul Christman Lornah Kipalgat
2007	Sue Lee Greg White
2008	Steve Jones Carey Pinkowski Mel Schriefer
2009	Constantina Dita
2010	Glenn Latimer
2011	Betsy Silzer
2012	Gary Childs
2013	Mary Boone
2014	Hon. Ray LaHood
2015	Jerry Riebling
2016	Gary Wesley
2017	Diane Nukuri
2018	Martha Reese Leo Vandervlugt
2019	Joy Kessler Philip Lockwood
