= Tharcisse Gashaka =

Burundian long-distance runner (born 1962)

Personal information
- Full name: Tharcisse Gashaka
- Nationality: Burundian
- Born: 18 December 1962 (age 63)
- Height: 178 cm (5.84 ft)
- Weight: 72 kg (159 lb)
Medal record
Men's athletics
Representing Burundi
Jeux de la Francophonie
| Silver medal – second place | 1997 Antananarivo | 10,000 m |

Tharcisse Gashaka (born 18 December 1962) is a Burundian long-distance runner. He started competing for Burundi internationally in the 1990s and competed mostly in France. There he set multiple personal bests in different distances such as the marathon and one hour run.

Gashaka was then selected to be part of the first Burundian team at the Olympic Games, doing so at the 1996 Summer Olympics. He competed in the men's marathon and placed 90th overall. After the Summer Games, he competed at the 1997 Jeux de la Francophonie and earned a silver medal in the men's 10,000 metres.

== Biography ==
Tharcisse Gashaka was born on 18 December 1962 in Burundi. He started competing internationally in the late 1990s, mostly in France. He set personal bests in the one hour run with a distance of 19,844 metres, in the 20K run with 1:00:42, and the marathon with a time of 2:13:45 set at the Puteaux Marathon.

Gashaka then competed at the Neufchâtel-Hardelot Half Marathon and set a personal best in a time of 1:02:55. He was selected to be part of the first Burundian team at an Olympic Games, representing Burundi at the 1996 Summer Olympics in Atlanta, United States. He competed in the men's marathon on 4 August against 123 other competitors. He set a time of 2:32:55 and placed 90th overall.

After the 1996 Summer Games, he was selected to compete for Burundi at the 1997 Jeux de la Francophonie in Antananarivo, Madagascar. He first competed in the men's 3000 metre steeplechase on 4 September. He set a time of 9:17.80 and placed sixth overall. Two days later, he competed in the men's 10,000 metres and set a time of 29:58.02, earning him the silver medal.
