= Emery Nziyunvira =

Burundian swimmer (born 1984)

Personal information
- Full name: Emery Nziyunvira
- National team: Burundi
- Born: 19 March 1984 (age 42)
- Height: 1.80 m (5 ft 11 in)
- Weight: 62 kg (137 lb)

Sport
- Sport: Swimming
- Strokes: Freestyle

Emery Nziyunvira (born 19 March 1984) is a Burundian former swimmer, who specialized in sprint freestyle events. At the 2004 Summer Olympics in Athens, Nziyunvira was elected by the Burundi National Olympic Committee (French: Comité National Olympique du Burundi) to carry the nation's flag in the opening ceremony. He qualified for the men's 100 m freestyle, by receiving a Universality place from FINA in an entry time of 1:09.84. He challenged six other swimmers in heat one, including 34-year-old Mumtaz Ahmed of Pakistan. He rounded out the field to last place in a lifetime best of 1:09.40, exactly 43 seconds faster than a historic record time of 1:52.72, held by Equatorial Guinea's Eric Moussambani in 2000. Nziyunvira failed to advance into the semifinals, as he placed sixty-ninth overall out of 71 swimmers in the preliminaries.

Olympic Games
Preceded by Diane Nukuri	Flagbearer for Burundi; 2004 Athens	Succeeded by Francine Niyonizigiye
