= Ornella Havyarimana =

Burundian boxer (born 1994)

Personal information
- Nationality: Burundian
- Born: 1 September 1994 (age 31)

Sport
- Sport: Boxing
- Event: Flyweight

Achievements and titles
- Olympic finals: 2020 Summer Olympics

Ornella Havyarimana (born 1 September 1994) is a Burundian boxer.

She took part in the 2020 Summer Olympics, held in 2021. She carried the flag for Burundi in the Parade of Nations at the opening ceremony, along with swimmer Belly-Cresus Ganira. Her forename appears as Omella in some sources.

She competed in the women's flyweight boxing competition at the 2020 Olympics.

Olympic Games
Preceded by Olivier Irabaruta	Flag bearer for Burundi; 2020 Tokyo with Belly-Cresus Ganira	Succeeded by Ange Niragira; Belly-Cresus Ganira
