= Tharcisse Niyongabo =

Burundian politician

Tharcisse Niyongabo is a Burundian politician who was appointed governor of Bubanza Province on 3 April 2015, replacing Anselme Nyandwi who was sacked for refusing to support the third term bid of president Pierre Nkurunziza. He was an official in the Burundi senate when he was appointed. Niyongabo's tenure as governor was plagued by armed confrontation between government forces and militia. In August 2017, Niyongabo motorcade ran into an ambush of an unnamed armed group in Gihanga Commune, along Bujumbura-Cibitoke road, in the west of Burundi.
