= Francine Niyonizigiye =

Burundian long-distance runner

Francine Niyonizigiye (born 26 September 1988) is a Burundian athlete who specializes in the long-distance running.

She competed at the 2008 Summer Olympics in Beijing, in the 5000 metres, where she was placed fourteenth in the heats at a time of 17:08.44. Niyonizigiye was also the flag bearer at the opening ceremony.

Olympic Games
Preceded by Emery Nziyunvira	Flagbearer for Burundi; 2008 Beijing	Succeeded by Diane Nukuri
