= Joachim Nshimirimana =

Burundian long-distance runner

Joachim Nshimirimana (born January 13, 1973) is a Burundian athlete who specialized in marathon and long-distance running. He represented Burundi at two Olympic games (2004 in Athens, and 2008 in Beijing) and also holds Italian citizenship.

At age 31, Nshimirimana first competed at the 2004 Summer Olympics in Athens, where he finished 32nd and completed the run in the men's marathon, with a time of 2:19:31. At his second Olympics in Beijing, he finished the men's marathon in 68th place, with a time of 2:29:55.

In 2006, Nshimirimana won his first championship title at the Ljubljana Marathon, with his personal best time of 2:14:14.
