= Aloÿs Nizigama =

Burundian long-distance runner

Aloÿs Nizigama (born 18 June 1966) is a retired Burundian long-distance runner who specialized in the 5000 and 10,000 metres.

His personal best 10,000 metres time was 27:20.38 minutes, achieved in July 1995 in London. This is the current Burundian record.

In his career, Nizigama ran 21 sub-28 minute 10,000 metres races, 2nd only to Haile Gebrselassie with 23 times.

== International competitions ==
Representing Burundi
Year	Competition	Venue	Position	Event	Notes
1991	World Championships	Tokyo, Japan	6th	10,000 m	
1993	World Championships	Stuttgart, Germany	7th	5,000 m	
1993	World Championships	Stuttgart, Germany	5th	10,000 m	
1996	Olympic Games	Atlanta, United States	4th	10,000 m	
2000	Olympic Games	Sydney, Australia	9th	10,000 m	
2001	Jeux de la Francophonie	Ottawa-Hull, Canada	3rd	10,000 m	
