= Belly-Cresus Ganira =

Burundian swimmer (born 2000)

Personal information
- Born: March 25, 2000 (age 26) Bujumbura, Burundi

Sport
- Country: Burundi
- Sport: Swimming

Belly-Cresus Ganira (born 25 March 2000 in Bujumbura) is a Burundian swimmer. He competed in the men's 100m freestyle event at the 2020 Summer Olympics. His time of 54.33 seconds did not qualify for the semifinals.

== Early years ==
Ganira grew up in the Kinanira II neighborhood of Bujumbura. He began swimming at the age of four and joined a competitive club at age 10.

== Career ==
In 2019, Ganira was awarded a grant to train at the FINA Development Centre in Dakar, Senegal for one year.

Ganira broke six national records at the 2020 African Zone 2 Championships in Ghana, improving on five of his own records and breaking Billy-Scott Irakose's mark in the 50 metre freestyle event.

Olympic Games
Preceded by Olivier Irabaruta	Flag bearer for Burundi; 2020 Tokyo with Ornella Havyarimana; 2024 Paris with Ange Niragira	Succeeded by Incumbent
