= Dieudonné Kwizera =

Burundian middle-distance runner

Dieudonné Kwizera (born 6 August 1967) is a retired Burundian middle distance runner who specialized in the 800 metres.

In 1987 he won a bronze medal at the All-Africa Games in Nairobi, and the next year he finished third at the IAAF Grand Prix Final behind Tom McKean and Sebastian Coe, both of Great Britain.

== International competitions ==
Representing Burundi
Year	Competition	Venue	Position	Event	Notes
1987	All-Africa Games	Nairobi, Kenya	3rd	800 m	1:46.69

Olympic Games
Preceded by First	Flagbearer for Burundi; 1996 Atlanta	Succeeded by Diane Nukuri
