= Francine Niyonsaba =

Burundian middle-distance runner

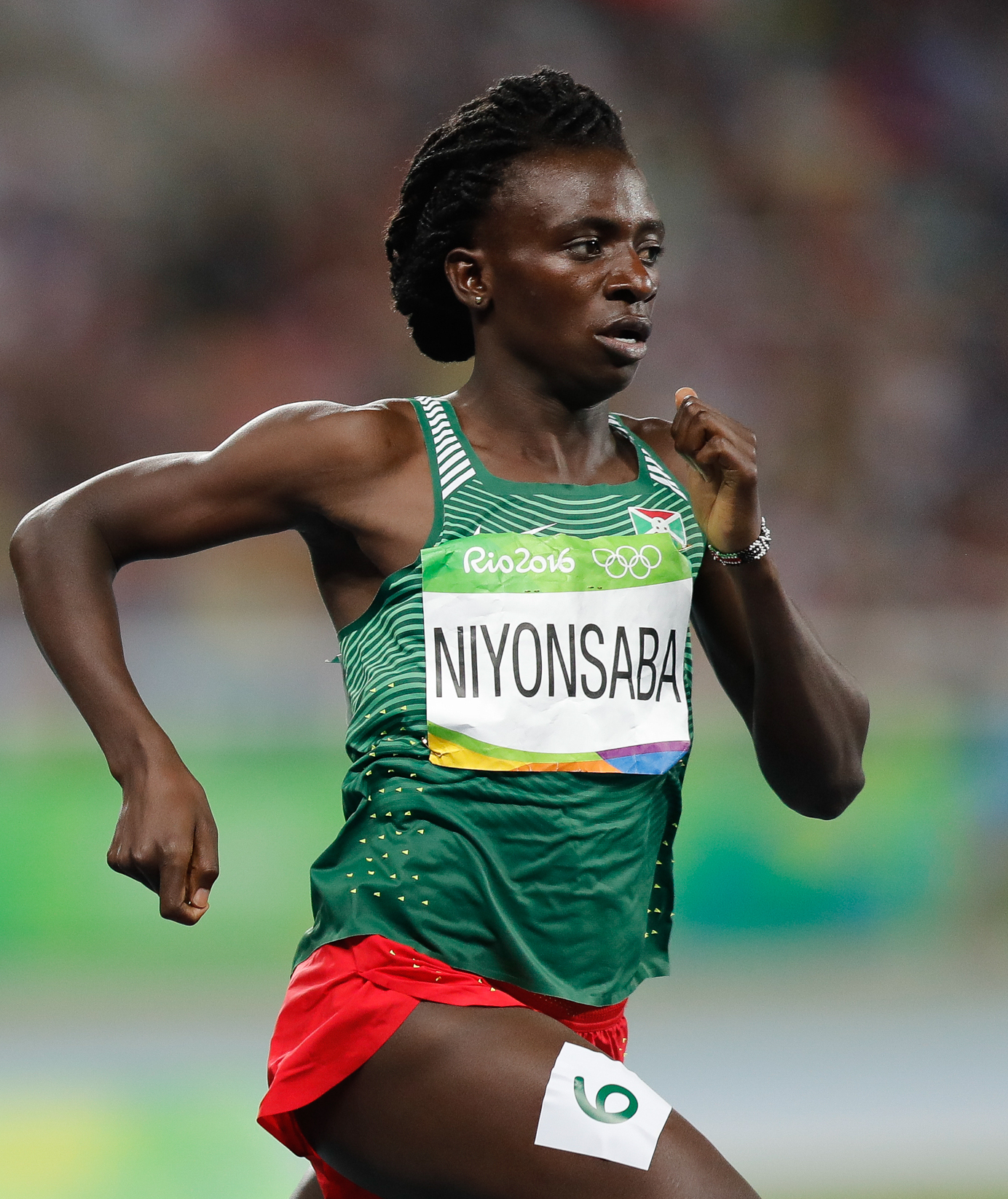
- Niyonsaba at the 2016 Rio Olympics

Personal information
- Born: 5 May 1993 (age 33) Nkanda Bweru, Ruyigi Province, Burundi
- Height: 1.66 m (5 ft 5 in)
- Weight: 60 kg (132 lb)

Sport
- Country: Burundi
- Sport: Athletics
- Events: Middle-, Long-distance running 800 meters (–2019)

Achievements and titles
- Personal bests: 400 m: 53.48 NR (2018); 800 m: 1:55.47 NR (2017); 2000 m: 5:21.56 AR (2021); 3000 m: 8:19.08 NR (2021); Two miles: 8:59.08 NR (2022); 5000 m: 14:25.34 NR (2021); 10,000 m: 30:41.93 NR (2021)
Medal record
Women's athletics
Representing Burundi
Olympic Games
Silver medal – second place	2016 Rio de Janeiro	800 m
World Championships
Silver medal – second place	2017 London	800 m
World Indoor Championships
Gold medal – first place	2016 Portland	800 m
Gold medal – first place	2018 Birmingham	800 m
Diamond League
First place	2021	5000 m
African Championships
Gold medal – first place	2012 Porto-Novo	800 m
Silver medal – second place	2018 Asaba	800 m

Francine Niyonsaba (born May 5, 1993) is a Burundian runner who specialized in the 800 metres and shifted to longer distances in 2019. She was the 2016 Rio Olympics silver medalist in the women's 800 metres. Her silver medal was the first Olympic medal for Burundi since 1996. Niyonsaba won a silver in the event at the 2017 World Championships.

She is a two-time 800 m world indoor champion, having won 800 m in 2016 and 2018. After her move to longer distances, Niyonsaba finished fifth over the 10,000 metres at the 2020 Tokyo Olympics. With a time of 5:21.56, Niyonsaba holds the African record in the 2000 metres, set in 2021, along with seven Burundian records. Her 2000 metres time was previously the world record until it was broken by Jessica Hull in 2024, who ran 5:19.70.

In 2019, World Athletics announced that Niyonsaba would not be allowed to compete under the female classification in events between 400 metres and one mile due to its regulations on XY DSD athletes with naturally high testosterone levels.

== Career ==
Francine Niyonsaba quickly rose to prominence in 2012 while still a teenager. The first time she set the 800 metres record was in late June 2012 while narrowly winning the 2012 African Championships in Athletics in 1:59.11 in what was only her third competitive race. At that, she improved upon her own previous national record of 2:02.13, set in the qualifying round. In the opening round race, the inexperienced runner had opened up a 30 meters lead the pack. Three weeks later, on July 20, 2012, she improved the record again to 1:58.68 while finishing second at the 2012 Diamond League meeting at Herculis.

During the 2012 London Olympics, Niyonsaba reduced her own 800 m record to 1:58.67 on 9 August, in the semi-final round. It was a 0.01 seconds improvement on her previous record. Two days later, she finished seventh (subsequently upgraded to fifth as a result of the doping disqualifications of Russian athletes Elena Arzhakova and Mariya Savinova) in the final. Less than a month later, she took the record down to 1:56.59.

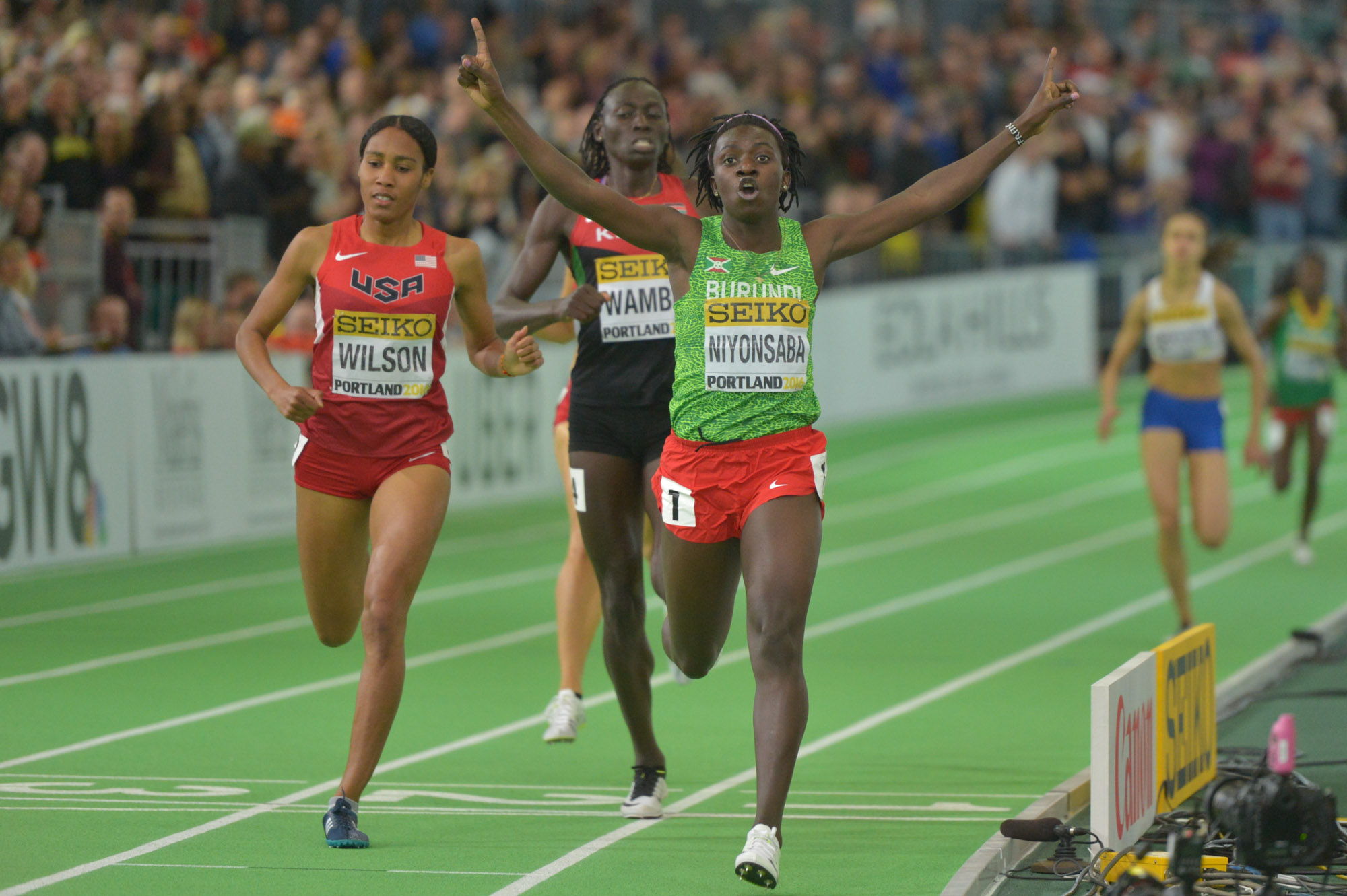
Niyonsaba wins the 800 m at the 2016 World Indoor Championships in Portland.

In 2016, Niyonsaba won the 800 meters at the 2016 IAAF World Indoor Championships with a time of 2:00.01. Competing at the Summer Olympics held in Rio de Janeiro later that year, she claimed her first Olympic medal, a silver in the women's 800 m in a time of 1:56.49, behind Caster Semenya of South Africa. Niyonsaba finished second in 800 meters seven race series of Diamond League. She improved her personal best to 1:56.24 at the Herculis meet in Monaco.

In 2017, Niyonsaba earned a new personal best and national record at the Monaco Diamond League after winning the 800 m there in a time of 1:55.47 on July 21. With this time, she was the world leader heading into the 2017 World Championships in Athletics in London. At the event, she won a silver with a time of 1:55.92. She led throughout the majority of the race, but Caster Semenya used her phenomenal final kick to pass the Burundian on the home stretch once again and win gold.

== World Athletics ruling ==
In 2019, it was revealed that Niyonsaba was born with the 46,XY karyotype and an intersex condition after her qualification for IAAF women's competition was ruled out by the association's new regulations for athletes with XY differences of sexual development, testosterone levels above 5 nmol/L, and androgen sensitivity. Due to her stress fracture, Niyonsaba missed the 2022 World Athletics Championships in Oregon.

She was one of the athletes whose cases were profiled in Phyllis Ellis's 2022 documentary film Category: Woman.

== Achievements ==
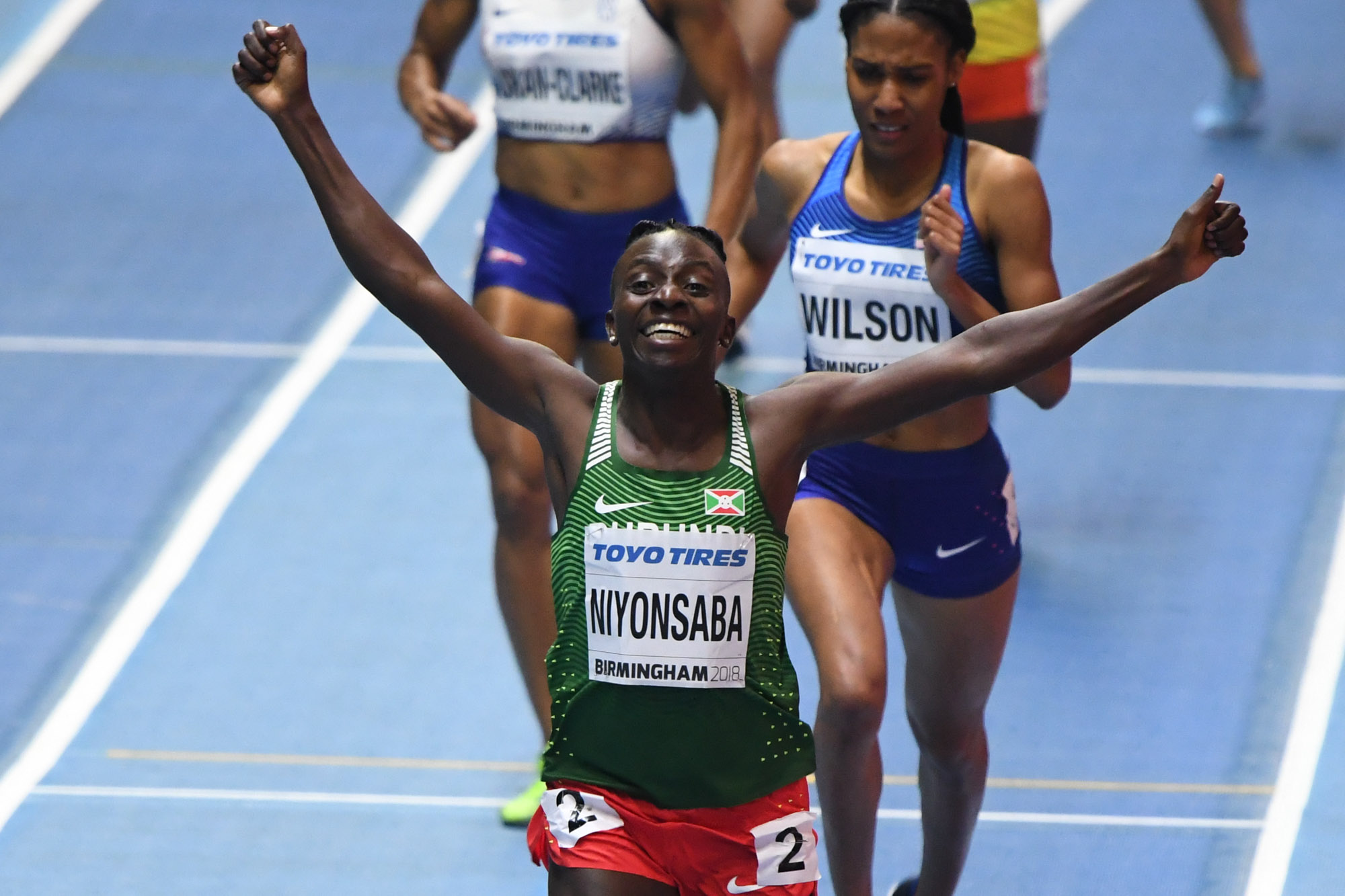
Francine Niyonsaba triumphs in the 800 m at the World Indoor Championships held in Birmingham.

=== International competitions ===
Representing Burundi
Year	Competition	Venue	Position	Event	Time	Notes
2012	African Championships	Porto-Novo, Benin	1st	800 m	1:59.11	NR
2012	Olympic Games	London, United Kingdom	4th	800 m	1:59.63	
2016	World Indoor Championships	Portland, United States	1st	800 m i	2:00.01	WL
2016	Olympic Games	Rio de Janeiro, Brazil	2nd	800 m	1:56.49	
2017	World Championships	London, United Kingdom	2nd	800 m	1:55.92	
2018	World Indoor Championships	Birmingham, United Kingdom	1st	800 m i	1:58.31	WL NR
2018	African Championships	Asaba, Nigeria	2nd	800 m	1:57.97	
2021	Olympic Games	Tokyo, Japan	–	5000 m	DQ	TR 17.3.2
2021	Olympic Games	Tokyo, Japan	5th	10,000 m	30:41.93	NR

=== Circuit wins and titles ===
- Diamond League champion 5000 m: 2021
  - 2012 (1 – 800 m): Brussels (NR)
  - 2013 (3 – 800 m): Shanghai (WL), Eugene (WL MR), Paris
  - 2016 (2 – 800 m): Birmingham (MR), Lausanne
  - 2017 (2 – 800 m): Stockholm, Lausanne (SB)
  - 2018 (2 – 800 m): Lausanne, Rabat
  - 2021 [4]: Eugene (Two miles, MR), Paris (3000 m, WL MR NR), Brussels (5000 m, WL NR), Zürich (5000 m)
  - 2022 (2): Doha (3000 m, WL), Eugene (Two miles, WL MR)
