= Elsie Uwamahoro =

Burundian swimmer

Personal information
- Born: October 23, 1988 (age 37)

Sport
- Sport: Swimming

Elsie Uwamahoro (born October 23, 1988) is a Burundian swimmer. She competed at the 2008 Summer Olympics in Beijing, and at the 2012 Summer Olympics in London and ranked 67 overall, which was not enough to get Uwamahoro to the semifinals. She also competed in the 50 m and 100 m freestyle events at the 2013 World Aquatics Championships.

In 2016, she competed in the women's 50 metre freestyle at the 2016 Summer Olympics held in Rio de Janeiro, Brazil. She finished in 80th place in the heats with a time of 33.70 and she did not advance to the semi-finals.
