= Burundi National Olympic Committee =

National Olympic Committee

- Country: Burundi
- Code: BDI
- Created: 1990
- Recognized: 1993
- Continental Association: ANOCA
- President: Lydia Nsekera
- Secretary General: Salvator Bigirimana

The Burundi National Olympic Committee (French: Comité National Olympique du Burundi) (IOC code: BDI) is the National Olympic Committee representing Burundi.

== See also ==
- Sport in Burundi
