= Olivier Irabaruta =

Burundian long-distance runner

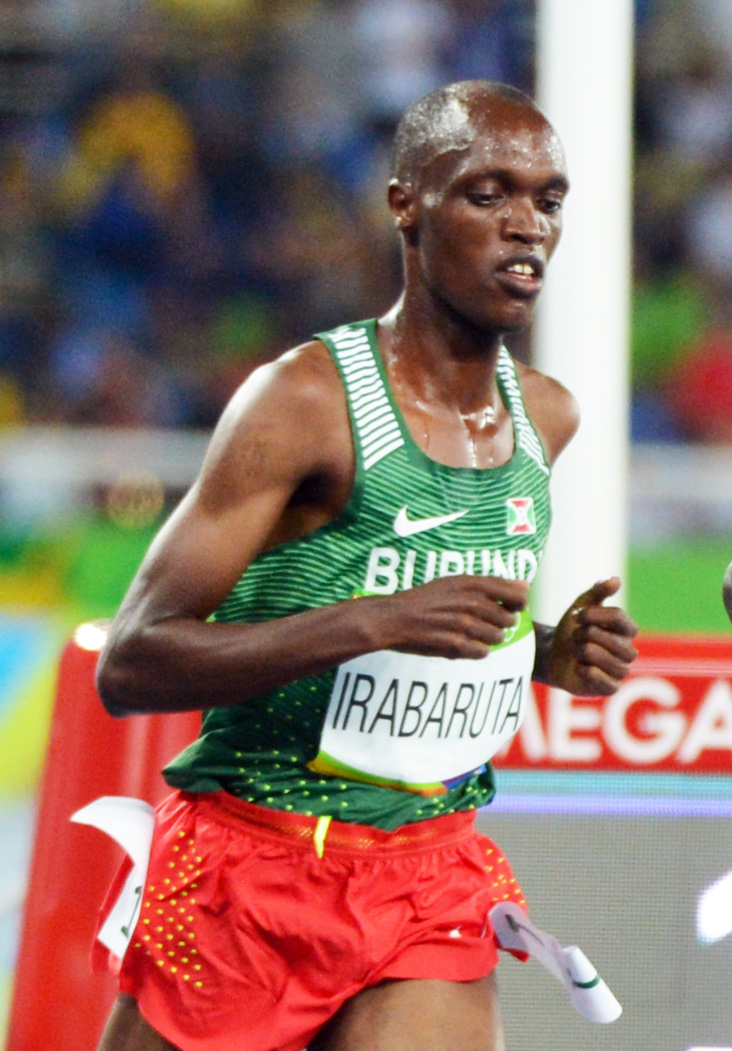
- Olivier Irabaruta at the 2016 Olympics

Personal information
- Nationality: Burundi
- Born: 25 August 1990 (age 35) Muramvya, Burundi
- Height: 170 cm (5 ft 7 in)
- Weight: 62 kg (137 lb)

Sport
- Sport: Athletics
- Club: G.P. Parco Alpi Apuane, Italy

Olivier Irabaruta (born 25 August 1990) is a Burundian long-distance runner. At the 2012 Summer Olympics, he competed in the Men's 5000 metres, finishing 29th overall in Round 1, failing to qualify for the final.

At the 2016 Summer Olympics, he competed in the 5000 metres and the 10,000 metres. He finished 27th overall in round 1 of the 5000 m competition and did not qualify for the finals. He finished 27th in the 10,000m competition. Irabaruta was the flag bearer for Burundi during the Parade of Nations.

He represented his country at the IAAF World Cross Country Championships in 2009 as a junior runner and in 2015, 2017, and 2019 as a senior athlete.

In 2019, he competed in the men's marathon at the 2019 World Athletics Championships held in Doha, Qatar. He did not finish his race.

He represented Burundi at the 2020 Summer Olympics in the men's marathon.

Olympic Games
| Preceded by Diane Nukuri | Flagbearer for Burundi; 2016 Rio de Janeiro | Succeeded by Ornella Havyarimana; Belly-Cresus Ganira |
