= Vénuste Niyongabo =

Burundian runner

Medal record

Men's Athletics

Representing Burundi

Olympic Games
Gold medal – first place	1996 Atlanta	5000 m

World Championships
Bronze medal – third place	1995 Gothenburg	1500 m

Vénuste Niyongabo OLY (born December 9, 1973) is a Burundian former long and middle-distance runner. In 1996, he became the first Olympic medalist from Burundi by winning the 5000 metres at the 1996 Summer Olympics. He had only competed twice before in that event prior to winning the gold medal.

== Biography ==
Born in Vugizo, in southern Burundi, Niyongabo won a silver medal in the 1500 m at the 1992 World Junior Championships and also came fourth over 800 metres. He competed in his first senior tournament the following year, but was eliminated in the 1500 m semi-finals of the World Championships in Stuttgart. Niyongabo soon became one of the top 1500 m runners in the world, winning several major races in 1994 and 1995. He also won a bronze medal at the World Championships in Gothenburg, finishing behind Noureddine Morceli and Hicham El Guerrouj.

For the 1996 Olympics, held in Atlanta, Niyongabo was assumed to be a potential winner of the 1500 m, but he decided to forfeit his place to a compatriot, Dieudonné Kwizera. Kwizera had been unable to compete in the 1988 and 1992 Olympics since Burundi did not have a National Olympic Committee at the time, and was only in Atlanta as a coach. Niyongabo moved up to compete in the 5000 m event instead. The move turned out to be a good one for both athletes; Kwizera finally became an Olympian, while Niyongabo sprinted away in the last lap of the 5000 m final to win an unexpected gold medal.

He also is the thirteenth fastest miler ever, putting him behind only Josh Kerr, Hicham El Guerrouj, Noah Ngeny, Jakob Ingebrigtsen, Yared Nuguse, Noureddine Morceli, Niels Laros, Cole Hocker, Cameron Myers, Steve Cram, Daniel Komen and Azeddine Habz.

After the Olympics, Niyongabo struggled with several injuries, and never achieved the same level of competition again. His attempt to defend his title at the 2000 Summer Olympics failed, placing only 15th in his semi-final heat.

Niyongabo worked for the Ekin division of Nike, Inc. in Italy. He ran on the elite Nike Bowerman International team in the Hood to Coast Relay in 2005, which finished second in a field of 1062 teams.

Venuste is today a member of the ‘Champions for Peace’ club, a group of 54 famous elite athletes committed to serving peace in the world through sport, created by Peace and Sport, a Monaco-based international organization.

In October 2010, he sponsored the very first "Friendship Games" which took place in the Great Lakes region of Africa: a day of trans-border sports competitions to promote peace and unite young people from Burundi and the Democratic Republic of Congo (DRC) around the values of friendship and fraternity offered by sport.
