= 1995 IAAF World Cross Country Championships – Senior men's race =

Senior men's race at the 1995 IAAF World Cross Country Championships
- Organisers: IAAF
- Edition: 23rd
- Date: March 25
- Host city: Durham, County Durham, United Kingdom
- Venue: University of Durham
- Events: 1
- Distances: 12.02 km – Senior men
- Participation: 227 athletes from 52 nations

The Senior men's race at the 1995 IAAF World Cross Country Championships was held in Durham, United Kingdom, at the University of Durham on March 25, 1995. A report on the event was given in The New York Times and in the Herald.

Complete results, medallists, and the results of British athletes were published.

== Race results ==
=== Senior men's race (12.02 km) ===
==== Individual ====
Rank	Athlete	Country	Time
1st place, gold medalist(s)	Paul Tergat	Kenya	34:05
2nd place, silver medalist(s)	Ismael Kirui	Kenya	34:13
3rd place, bronze medalist(s)	Salah Hissou	Morocco	34:14
4	Haile Gebrselassie	Ethiopia	34:26
5	Brahim Lahlafi	Morocco	34:34
6	Paulo Guerra	Portugal	34:38
7	James Songok	Kenya	34:41
8	Simon Chemoiywo	Kenya	34:46
9	Todd Williams	United States	34:47
10	Martín Fiz	Spain	34:50
11	Elarbi Khattabi	Morocco	34:55
12	Abdelaziz Sahere	Morocco	35:00
13	José Manuel García	Spain	35:01
14	Bob Kennedy	United States	35:02
15	Julius Ondieki	Kenya	35:02
16	Mustapha Essaïd	France	35:03
17	Abdellah Béhar	France	35:03
18	José Carlos Adán	Spain	35:05
19	Antonio Serrano	Spain	35:07
20	Andrew Pearson	United Kingdom	35:07
21	Ayele Mezegebu	Ethiopia	35:11
22	António Pinto	Portugal	35:11
23	Domingos Castro	Portugal	35:14
24	José Regalo	Portugal	35:16
25	Shaun Creighton	Australia	35:19
26	Addis Abebe	Ethiopia	35:21
27	Chala Kelele	Ethiopia	35:24
28	Alejandro Gómez	Spain	35:30
29	William Kiptum	Kenya	35:35
30	Simeon Rono	Kenya	35:37
31	Carlos Monteiro	Portugal	35:38
32	Antonio Pérez	Spain	35:39
33	Eduardo Henriques	Portugal	35:39
34	Elenilson da Silva	Brazil	35:40
35	Hendrick Ramaala	South Africa	35:41
36	Julio Rey	Spain	35:42
37	Ibrahim Seid	Ethiopia	35:44
38	Vincenzo Modica	Italy	35:46
39	Hammou Boutayeb	Morocco	35:47
40	Simon Morolong	South Africa	35:47
41	Mustapha Bamouh	Morocco	35:48
42	Jean Verster	South Africa	35:49
43	Umberto Pusterla	Italy	35:49
44	David Burke	Ireland	35:50
45	Joaquim Pinheiro	Portugal	35:50
46	Jeff Schiebler	Canada	35:51
47	Benedict Ako	Tanzania	35:52
48	Bartolomé Serrano	Spain	35:53
49	Sergey Fedotov	Russia	35:54
50	Salvatore Bettiol	Italy	35:56
51	Chris Weber	Canada	35:57
52	Tetiani Moyo	Zimbabwe	35:58
53	Maurizio Leone	Italy	35:59
54	Tegenu Abebe	Ethiopia	36:00
55	Keith Cullen	United Kingdom	36:00
56	Carsten Jørgensen	Denmark	36:01
57	Angelo Carosi	Italy	36:01
58	Owen MacHelm	South Africa	36:02
59	Martin Jones	United Kingdom	36:02
60	Brad Barquist	United States	36:04
61	Tesgie Legesse	Ethiopia	36:04
62	Jim Westphal	United States	36:05
63	Gennadiy Panin	Russia	36:06
64	Noel Cullen	Ireland	36:06
65	Jose Orlando Sanchez Guerrero	Colombia	36:07
66	Anton Nicolaison	South Africa	36:07
67	Gideon Chirchir	Kenya	36:08
68	Julian Paynter	Australia	36:08
69	Osamu Nara	Japan	36:10
70	Kerry Rodger	New Zealand	36:11
71	Adrian Passey	United Kingdom	36:14
72	Christian Stephenson	United Kingdom	36:14
73	Nigousse Urge	Ethiopia	36:15
74	Richard Hope	Australia	36:15
75	Mickael Dufermont	France	36:16
76	Abderrahim Zitouna	Morocco	36:17
77	Dave Clarke	United Kingdom	36:17
78	Abel Antón	Spain	36:18
79	Pyotr Sarafynyuk	Ukraine	36:18
80	Yuriy Chizhov	Russia	36:19
81	Tommy Murray	United Kingdom	36:20
82	Dan Nelson	United States	36:20
83	Eric Morrison	United States	36:21
84	Andrea Arlati	Italy	36:23
85	Jacques van Rensburg	South Africa	36:25
86	Klaus-Peter Hansen	Denmark	36:27
87	Nicolas Nyengerai	Zimbabwe	36:28
88	Keith Dowling	United States	36:29
89	Noel Berkeley	Ireland	36:30
90	Stefano Baldini	Italy	36:30
91	Ayele Setegne	Israel	36:30
92	Dieter Baumann	Germany	36:31
93	Francis Nade	Tanzania	36:31
94	Enoch Skosana	South Africa	36:32
95	Viktor Rogovoy	Ukraine	36:33
96	John Lory	Tanzania	36:33
97	Hans van der Hoeven	Belgium	36:34
98	Arnold Mächler	Switzerland	36:34
99	Jean-Benoît César Guyto	France	36:35
100	Bobby Quinn	United Kingdom	36:36
101	Daniel Ferreira	Brazil	36:40
102	Sean Quilty	Australia	36:41
103	Michal Kucera	Czech Republic	36:41
104	Didier Sainthorand	France	36:44
105	Girma Tolla	Ethiopia	36:45
106	Emmanuel Matashu	Zimbabwe	36:45
107	Imre Berkovics	Hungary	36:45
108	Jan Pesava	Czech Republic	36:46
109	Marly Sopyev	Turkmenistan	36:47
110	Yoshinori Yokota	Japan	36:50
111	Dominique Chauvelier	France	36:51
112	Peter van der Velden	Netherlands	36:52
113	Dong Jiangmin	China	36:54
114	Markus Graf	Switzerland	36:56
115	Fraser Bertram	Canada	36:58
116	Nicolae Negru	Romania	36:58
117	Winston Muzini	Zimbabwe	36:59
118	Cormac Finnerty	Ireland	37:00
119	Luca Barzaghi	Italy	37:02
120	Makhosonke Fika	South Africa	37:03
121	Spencer Duval	United Kingdom	37:03
122	Phil Costley	New Zealand	37:05
123	John Burke	Ireland	37:07
124	Dionísio Castro	Portugal	37:08
125	Adalberto Garcia	Brazil	37:10
126	Igor Osmak	Ukraine	37:11
127	Kingston Maringe	Zimbabwe	37:13
128	Brighton Chipere	Zimbabwe	37:17
129	Tomix da Costa	Brazil	37:18
130	Marcel Laros	Netherlands	37:19
131	Laban Nkete	South Africa	37:22
132	Dave Reid	Canada	37:23
133	Benedito Gomes	Brazil	37:23
134	Jurmain Mitchell	Jamaica	37:23
135	Peter Matthews	Ireland	37:24
136	Santtu Mäkinen	Finland	37:24
137	Gao Jinhai	China	37:25
138	Freddy Silva	Colombia	37:25
139	Aleksandr Kuzin	Ukraine	37:32
140	Borislav Devic	Yugoslavia	37:32
141	Andrey Gladishev	Ukraine	37:34
142	Dominic Kirui	Kenya	37:34
143	Paul Smith	New Zealand	37:37
144	Jukka Vähä-Vahe	Finland	37:39
145	José Riveros	Colombia	37:42
146	Robin Punt	Netherlands	37:44
147	Carlos Grisales	Colombia	37:47
148	Selestini Robert Naali	Tanzania	37:49
149	Bruno Le Stum	France	37:52
150	Brett Cartwright	Australia	37:53
151	Vladimir Afanasyev	Russia	37:55
152	Gianni Crepaldi	Italy	37:56
153	Wilson Theleso	Botswana	37:56
154	Edgar Sánchez	Colombia	38:01
155	Romeo Zivko	Croatia	38:07
156	Herman Hofstee	Netherlands	38:08
157	John Trautmann	United States	38:09
158	Stan Rijken	Netherlands	38:11
159	William Roldán	Colombia	38:15
160	Tsai Ching-Chou	Chinese Taipei	38:15
161	Antonio Neto	Brazil	38:31
162	Luis Collazo	Puerto Rico	38:33
163	Farag Abdelnaby	Egypt	38:37
164	Zhai Fake	China	38:39
165	Vladimir Kiselyov	Kyrgyzstan	38:43
166	Abdul Sameer Moos	Mauritius	38:53
167	Kabo Gabaseme	Botswana	38:53
168	Modise Mosarwa	Botswana	38:54
169	Frederick Baldacchino	Malta	38:55
170	Jean-François Bertron	France	38:59
171	Richard Mulligan	Ireland	39:04
172	Fouly Salem	Egypt	39:18
173	Simon Vroemen	Netherlands	39:24
174	Mohamed Al-Malki	Yemen	39:25
175	Dmitriy Bogush	Moldova	39:26
176	Joseph Tjitunga	Namibia	39:29
177	Wayne Larden	Australia	39:33
178	Boris Kaveshnikov	Kyrgyzstan	39:36
179	Ajay Chuttoo	Mauritius	39:39
180	Emerson Bem	Brazil	39:41
181	Gabriel Laboy	Puerto Rico	39:41
182	Sergiy Lebid	Ukraine	39:44
183	Menon Ramsamy	Mauritius	39:47
184	Modise Ndibicha	Botswana	39:52
185	Jorge López	Puerto Rico	39:55
186	Zachariah Ditetso	Botswana	40:00
187	Mohamed Al-Hada	Yemen	40:02
188	Basil Brown	Jamaica	40:06
189	Mike Felicite	Mauritius	40:13
190	Charygeldiy Allaberdiyev	Turkmenistan	40:30
191	Xandru Grech	Malta	40:35
192	Joseph Pace	Malta	40:57
193	Satish Huryl	Mauritius	41:02
194	Mohamed Al-Atashi	Yemen	41:04
195	Edwin Cardona	Puerto Rico	41:06
196	Bruno Armance	Mauritius	41:15
197	Edgardo Caban	Puerto Rico	41:23
198	Lee Kar-Lun	Hong Kong	41:24
199	Raul Rivera	Puerto Rico	41:28
200	Bigboy Dintwa	Botswana	41:38
201	Robert Attard	Malta	41:40
202	Leonid Pykhteyev	Kyrgyzstan	41:45
203	Abdulsalaam Sirag	Yemen	41:47
204	John Buhagiar	Malta	41:57
205	Ali Yahya	Yemen	41:59
206	Albert Shamsiyev	Uzbekistan	42:05
207	Raphael Camilleri	Malta	42:16
208	Hamud Said	Yemen	42:37
209	Michel Kilindo	Seychelles	42:54
210	Antoine Radegonde	Seychelles	43:00
211	Alexandr Dyrov	Uzbekistan	43:03
212	Makudi Mubenga	Zaire	44:34
—	Andrey Gordeyev	Belarus	DNF
—	Zakaria Gwandu	Tanzania	DNF
—	Paul McCloy	Canada	DNF
—	Thierry Pantel	France	DNF
—	Reuben Reina	United States	DNF
—	Andrew Sambu	Tanzania	DNF
—	Marcel Versteeg	Netherlands	DNF
—	Larbi Zéroual	Morocco	DNF
—	Aleksandr Saprykin	Kazakhstan	DNF
—	Focus Willbroad	Tanzania	DNF
—	Aleksandr Mikitenko	Kazakhstan	DNF
—	José Santos	Portugal	DNF
—	Simon Camilleri	Malta	DNF
—	Mahkmud Saifullayev	Uzbekistan	DNF
—	Atadjan Duzdyev	Turkmenistan	DNF

==== Teams ====
Rank	Team	Points
1st place, gold medalist(s)	Kenya: Paul Tergat / 1; Ismael Kirui / 2; James Songok / 7; Simon Chemoiywo / 8; Julius Ondieki / 15; William Kiptum / 29; (Simeon Rono) / (30); (Gideon Chirchir) / (67); (Dominic Kirui) / (142)	62
2nd place, silver medalist(s)	Morocco: Salah Hissou / 3; Brahim Lahlafi / 5; Elarbi Khattabi / 11; Abdelaziz Sahere / 12; Hammou Boutayeb / 39; Mustapha Bamouh / 41; (Abderrahim Zitouna) / (76); (Larbi Zéroual) / (DNF)	111
3rd place, bronze medalist(s)	Spain: Martín Fiz / 10; José Manuel García / 13; José Carlos Adán / 18; Antonio Serrano / 19; Alejandro Gómez / 28; Antonio Pérez / 32; (Julio Rey) / (36); (Bartolomé Serrano) / (48); (Abel Antón) / (78)	120
4	Portugal: Paulo Guerra / 6; António Pinto / 22; Domingos Castro / 23; José Regalo / 24; Carlos Monteiro / 31; Eduardo Henriques / 33; (Joaquim Pinheiro) / (45); (Dionísio Castro) / (124); (José Santos) / (DNF)	139
5	Ethiopia: Haile Gebrselassie / 4; Ayele Mezegebu / 21; Addis Abebe / 26; Chala Kelele / 27; Ibrahim Seid / 37; Tegenu Abebe / 54; (Tesgie Legesse) / (61); (Nigousse Urge) / (73); (Girma Tolla) / (105)	169
6	United States: Todd Williams / 9; Bob Kennedy / 14; Brad Barquist / 60; Jim Westphal / 62; Dan Nelson / 82; Eric Morrison / 83; (Keith Dowling) / (88); (John Trautmann) / (157); (Reuben Reina) / (DNF)	310
7	Italy: Vincenzo Modica / 38; Umberto Pusterla / 43; Salvatore Bettiol / 50; Maurizio Leone / 53; Angelo Carosi / 57; Andrea Arlati / 84; (Stefano Baldini) / (90); (Luca Barzaghi) / (119); (Gianni Crepaldi) / (152)	325
8	South Africa: Hendrick Ramaala / 35; Simon Morolong / 40; Jean Verster / 42; Owen MacHelm / 58; Anton Nicolaison / 66; Jacques van Rensburg / 85; (Enoch Skosana) / (94); (Makhosonke Fika) / (120); (Laban Nkete) / (131)	326
9	United Kingdom: Andrew Pearson / 20; Keith Cullen / 55; Martin Jones / 59; Adrian Passey / 71; Christian Stephenson / 72; Dave Clarke / 77; (Tommy Murray) / (81); (Bobby Quinn) / (100); (Spencer Duval) / (121)	354
10	France: Mustapha Essaïd / 16; Abdellah Béhar / 17; Mickael Dufermont / 75; Jean-Benoît César Guyto / 99; Didier Sainthorand / 104; Dominique Chauvelier / 111; (Bruno Le Stum) / (149); (Jean-François Bertron) / (170); (Thierry Pantel) / (DNF)	422
11	Ireland: David Burke / 44; Noel Cullen / 64; Noel Berkeley / 89; Cormac Finnerty / 118; John Burke / 123; Peter Matthews / 135; (Richard Mulligan) / (171)	573
12	Australia: Shaun Creighton / 25; Julian Paynter / 68; Richard Hope / 74; Sean Quilty / 102; Brett Cartwright / 150; Wayne Larden / 177	596
13	Zimbabwe: Tetiani Moyo / 52; Nicolas Nyengerai / 87; Emmanuel Matashu / 106; Winston Muzini / 117; Kingston Maringe / 127; Brighton Chipere / 128	617
14	Brazil: Elenilson da Silva / 34; Daniel Ferreira / 101; Adalberto Garcia / 125; Tomix da Costa / 129; Benedito Gomes / 133; Antonio Neto / 161; (Emerson Bem) / (180)	683
15	Ukraine: Pyotr Sarafynyuk / 79; Viktor Rogovoy / 95; Igor Osmak / 126; Aleksandr Kuzin / 139; Andrey Gladishev / 141; Sergiy Lebid / 182	762
16	Colombia: Jose Orlando Sanchez Guerrero / 65; Freddy Silva / 138; José Riveros / 145; Carlos Grisales / 147; Edgar Sánchez / 154; William Roldán / 159	808
17	Netherlands: Peter van der Velden / 112; Marcel Laros / 130; Robin Punt / 146; Herman Hofstee / 156; Stan Rijken / 158; Simon Vroemen / 173; (Marcel Versteeg) / (DNF)	875
18	Botswana: Wilson Theleso / 153; Kabo Gabaseme / 167; Modise Mosarwa / 168; Modise Ndibicha / 184; Zachariah Ditetso / 186; Bigboy Dintwa / 200	1058
19	Mauritius: Abdul Sameer Moos / 166; Ajay Chuttoo / 179; Menon Ramsamy / 183; Mike Felicite / 189; Satish Huryl / 193; Bruno Armance / 196	1106
20	Puerto Rico: Luis Collazo / 162; Gabriel Laboy / 181; Jorge López / 185; Edwin Cardona / 195; Edgardo Caban / 197; Raul Rivera / 199	1119
21	Malta: Frederick Baldacchino / 169; Xandru Grech / 191; Joseph Pace / 192; Robert Attard / 201; John Buhagiar / 204; Raphael Camilleri / 207; (Simon Camilleri) / (DNF)	1164
22	Yemen: Mohamed Al-Malki / 174; Mohamed Al-Hada / 187; Mohamed Al-Atashi / 194; Abdulsalaam Sirag / 203; Ali Yahya / 205; Hamud Said / 208	1171
DNF	Tanzania: (Benedict Ako) / (47); (Francis Nade) / (93); (John Lory) / (96); (Selestini Robert Naali) / (148); (Zakaria Gwandu) / (DNF); (Andrew Sambu) / (DNF); (Focus Willbroad) / (DNF)	DNF

- Note: Athletes in parentheses did not score for the team result

== Participation ==
An unofficial count yields the participation of 227 athletes from 52 countries in the Senior men's race. This is in agreement with the official numbers as published.

- Australia (6)
- Belarus (1)
- Belgium (1)
- Botswana (6)
- Brazil (7)
- Canada (5)
- China (3)
- Chinese Taipei (1)
- Colombia (6)
- Croatia (1)
- Czech Republic (2)
- Denmark (2)
- Egypt (2)
- Ethiopia (9)
- Finland (2)
- France (9)
- Germany (1)
- Hong Kong (1)
- Hungary (1)
- Ireland (7)
- Israel (1)
- Italy (9)
- Jamaica (2)
- Japan (2)
- Kazakhstan (2)
- Kenya (9)
- Kyrgyzstan (3)
- Malta (7)
- Mauritius (6)
- Moldova (1)
- Morocco (8)
- Namibia (1)
- Netherlands (7)
- New Zealand (3)
- Portugal (9)
- Puerto Rico (6)
- Romania (1)
- Russia (4)
- Seychelles (2)
- South Africa (9)
- Spain (9)
- Switzerland (2)
- Tanzania (7)
- Turkmenistan (3)
- Ukraine (6)
- United Kingdom (9)
- United States (9)
- Uzbekistan (3)
- Yemen (6)
- Yugoslavia (1)
- Zaire (1)
- Zimbabwe (6)

== See also ==
- 1995 IAAF World Cross Country Championships – Junior men's race
- 1995 IAAF World Cross Country Championships – Senior women's race
- 1995 IAAF World Cross Country Championships – Junior women's race
