= 1991 World Championships in Athletics – Men's 5000 metres =

These are the official results of the Men's 5000 metres event at the 1991 IAAF World Championships in Tokyo, Japan. There were a total number of 45 participating athletes, with three qualifying heats and the final held on 1 September 1991.

== Medalists ==
| Gold | Yobes Ondieki; Kenya (KEN) |
| Silver | Fita Bayisa; Ethiopia (ETH) |
| Bronze | Brahim Boutayeb; Morocco (MAR) |

== Records ==
Existing records at the start of the event.

| World Record | Saïd Aouita (MAR) | 12:58.39 | Rome, Italy | 27 July 1987 |
| Championship Record | John Ngugi (KEN) | 13:22.68 | Rome, Italy | 4 September 1987 |

== Final ==
At first, Italy's Stefano Mei led this final, but after 300 metres, Bob Kennedy of the United States passed him. Despite Kennedy's slight surge, the first 400-metre split was sluggish at 1:07.02. Kenya's Yobes Ondieki passed Kennedy on the second home straight, and accelerated the pace radically. Quickly Morocco's Khalid Skah and Brahim Boutayeb, Ethiopia's Fita Bayisa, Germany's Dieter Baumann, and Portugal's Domingos Castro positioned themselves behind the surging Kenyan runner. To demonstrate the categorical reverse of the early pedestrian pace, Ondieki clocked 2:06.90 at 800 metres. In other words, the final's second lap had been sprinted in 59.88 seconds! Ondieki kept his speed throttle up through 1,000 metres in 2:36.83. His surge caused the United States' Doug Padilla to lose contact with the other runners already before 1,200 metres. Two laps later, Ondieki was about three seconds ahead of Boutayeb and Bayisa, with an unofficial split of 5:09.48 at 2,000 metres. Baumann and Domingos Castro formed the second chasing pair, after Skah had dropped from their pace. Further behind, Dionisio Castro of Portugal (Domingos's twin brother) and Britain's Gary Staines were fighting for seventh place. Despite slowing down slightly in the third kilometre, Ondieki widened his lead as he speeded past 3,000 metres in 7:46.08. During the fourth kilometre, the Kenyan's brutal early pace started to take its toll on his legs, but neither Bayisa nor Boutayeb was able to appreciably close in on him. By contrast, Finland's Risto Ulmala broke away from the rear group, and caught Skah and Dionisio Castro. Slightly behind this trio ran Britain's Rob Denmark, who also passed his badly exhausted team mate Staines. Before 3,800 metres, Bayisa speeded away from Boutayeb. At 4,000 metres, the gradually tiring Ondieki led in 10:29.07. After 4,250 metres, the Kenyan lapped Padilla. Ondieki's unofficial time at 4,600 metres was 12:09.07. At the start of the last lap, Bayisa was still over six seconds behind the Kenyan. By 4,800 metres (Ondieki's split was 12:41.90), the Ethiopian had only been able to narrow the gap to about five seconds. Although he sprinted the home straight visibly faster than the fading Ondieki, Bayisa still lost to the Kenyan World Champion by over two seconds. Boutayeb held on to the bronze medal, while Baumann sprinted narrowly past Domingos Castro, and Skah pulled away from Ulmala and Dionisio Castro. (See the following YouTube video about this final race: https://www.youtube.com/watch?v=HJNXxbX8X4w 3705 World Track & Field 1991 5000m Men (the user: Basil Sage).)

| Rank | Final | Time |
|---|---|---|
| | Yobes Ondieki (KEN) | 13:14.45 CR |
| | Fita Bayisa (ETH) | 13:16.64 |
| | Brahim Boutayeb (MAR) | 13:22.70 |
| 4. | Dieter Baumann (GER) | 13:28.67 |
| 5. | Domingos Castro (POR) | 13:28.88 |
| 6. | Khalid Skah (MAR) | 13:32.90 |
| 7. | Risto Ulmala (FIN) | 13:33.46 |
| 8. | Dionisio Castro (POR) | 13:35.39 |
| 9. | Robert Denmark (GBR) | 13:36.24 |
| 10. | Ibrahim Kinuthia (KEN) | 13:38.96 |
| 11. | Abel Antón (ESP) | 13:39.00 |
| 12. | Bob Kennedy (USA) | 13:54.47 |
| 13. | Gary Staines (GBR) | 13:58.26 |
| 14. | Doug Padilla (USA) | 14:36.18 |
| — | Stefano Mei (ITA) | DNF |

== Qualifying heats ==
- Held on 30 August 1991

| Rank | Heat 1 | Time |
|---|---|---|
| 1. | Ibrahim Kinuthia (KEN) | 13:57.65 |
| 2. | Khalid Skah (MAR) | 13:58.45 |
| 3. | Gary Staines (GBR) | 13:58.68 |
| 4. | Doug Padilla (USA) | 13:58.83 |
| 5. | Andrew Sambu (TAN) | 13:59.01 |
| 6. | Marti ten Kate (NED) | 13:59.51 |
| 7. | Mikhail Dasko (URS) | 13:59.71 |
| 8. | Antonio Serrano (ESP) | 13:59.75 |
| 9. | Zeki Öztürk (TUR) | 14:06.20 |
| 10. | Jonny Danielsson (SWE) | 14:07.03 |
| 11. | Valdenor dos Santos (BRA) | 14:35.00 |
| 12. | Tsuluunbaatar Ariunsaikhan (MGL) | 15:26.62 |
| | Mauricio González (MEX) | DNF |
| | Dieudonne Lamothe (HAI) | DNF |
| | Prakash Davendra Singh (FIJ) | DNS |

| Rank | Heat 2 | Time |
|---|---|---|
| 1. | Brahim Boutayeb (MAR) | 13:53.75 |
| 2. | Dieter Baumann (GER) | 13:54.07 |
| 3. | Stefano Mei (ITA) | 13:54.35 |
| 4. | Dionisio Castro (POR) | 13:54.39 |
| 5. | Ondoro Osoro (KEN) | 13:54.41 |
| 6. | Ian Hamer (GBR) | 13:54.49 |
| 7. | Sławomir Majusiak (POL) | 13:57.98 |
| 8. | Reuben Reina (USA) | 13:59.19 |
| 9. | Martín Fiz (ESP) | 13:59.52 |
| 10. | John Halvorsen (NOR) | 14:14.85 |
| 11. | Katsuhito Kumagai (JPN) | 14:20.84 |
| 12. | Gerard de Gaetano (MLT) | 15:31.08 |
| | Addis Abebe (ETH) | DNS |
| | Daouda Kassougue (MTN) | DNS |
| | Lucas Eningo Elonga (GEQ) | DNS |

| Rank | Heat 3 | Time |
|---|---|---|
| 1. | Fita Bayissa (ETH) | 13:41.59 |
| 2. | Robert Denmark (GBR) | 13:46.25 |
| 3. | Yobes Ondieki (KEN) | 13:47.05 |
| 4. | Domingos Castro (POR) | 13:47.61 |
| 5. | Risto Ulmala (FIN) | 13:48.86 |
| 6. | Bob Kennedy (USA) | 13:53.56 |
| 7. | Abel Antón (ESP) | 13:53.60 |
| 8. | Mohamed Issangar (MAR) | 13:55.49 |
| 9. | Andrew Lloyd (AUS) | 13:59.71 |
| 10. | Frank O'Mara (IRL) | 14:03.19 |
| 11. | Kerry Rodger (NZL) | 14:03.81 |
| 12. | Yahia Azaidj (ALG) | 14:43.49 |
| 13. | Souley Oumarou (NIG) | 14:52.89 |
| 14. | Obva Elengha (CGO) | 15:37.13 |
| 15. | Abi Tayeh Charbi (LIB) | 16:13.21 |

== See also ==
- 1990 Men's European Championships 5000 metres (Split)
- Athletics at the 1992 Summer Olympics – Men's 5000 metres
- 1993 Men's World Championships 5000 metres (Stuttgart)
