= Athletics at the 1992 Summer Olympics – Men's 5000 metres =

Men's 5000 metres at the Games of the XXV Olympiad
- Venue: Estadi Olímpic de Montjuïc
- Dates: 6 August 1992 (heats); 8 August 1992 (final)
- Competitors: 56 from 41 nations
- Winning time: 13:12.52

Medalists
1st place, gold medalist(s)		Dieter Baumann; Germany
2nd place, silver medalist(s)		Paul Bitok; Kenya
3rd place, bronze medalist(s)		Fita Bayisa; Ethiopia

Official Video Highlights @ 11:18

These are the official results of the men's 5000 metres event at the 1992 Summer Olympics in Barcelona, Spain. There were a total number of 62 participating athletes, with four qualifying heats. The fastest three qualified for the final plus the four fastest others.

In the final, Dieter Baumann ran past a trio of African runners, finishing the last 100 meters in 11.9 seconds to take the gold.

== Medalists ==
Gold	Dieter Baumann; Germany
Silver	Paul Bitok; Kenya
Bronze	Fita Bayisa; Ethiopia

== Records ==
These were the standing world and Olympic records (in minutes) prior to the 1992 Summer Olympics.

World record	12:58.39	(Morocco) Saïd Aouita	Rome (ITA)	July 22, 1987
Olympic record	13:05.59	(Morocco) Saïd Aouita	Los Angeles (USA)	August 11, 1984

== Final ==
- Held on August 8, 1992

RANK	FINAL	TIME
	Dieter Baumann (GER)	13:12.52
	Paul Bitok (KEN)	13:12.71
	Fita Bayisa (ETH)	13:13.03
4.	Brahim Boutayeb (MAR)	13:13.27
5.	Yobes Ondieki (KEN)	13:17.50
6.	Worku Bikila (ETH)	13:23.52
7.	Rob Denmark (GBR)	13:27.76
8.	Abel Anton (ESP)	13:27.80
9.	Mohamed Issangar (MAR)	13:28.97
10.	Andrew Sambu (TAN)	13:37.20
11.	Domingos Castro (POR)	13:38.08
12.	Bob Kennedy (USA)	13:39.72
13.	Pascal Thiebault (FRA)	13:43.39
14.	Dominic Kirui (KEN)	13:45.16
15.	Marcel Versteeg (NED)	13:48.32
16.	Salvatore Antibo (ITA)	14:02.47

== Heats ==
RANK	HEAT 1	TIME
1.	Pascal Thiebault (FRA)	13:31.16
2.	Fita Bayisa (ETH)	13:31.24
3.	Abel Anton (ESP)	13:31.48
4.	Yobes Ondieki (KEN)	13:31.88
5.	Jack Buckner (GBR)	13:37.14
6.	John Doherty (IRL)	13:41.27
7.	Risto Ulmala (FIN)	13:52.52
8.	Mahmoud Kalboussi (TUN)	13:55.01
9.	Robert Ian Johnston (NZL)	13:57.87
10.	Brendan Matthias (CAN)	14:01.57
11.	Godfrey Siamusiye (ZAM)	14:08.83
12.	Aïssa Belaout (ALG)	15:02.76
13.	Tawai Keiruan (VAN)	15:27.46
14.	Yussuf Moli Yesky (CHA)	15:29.25
—	Apolineria Belisle Gomez (HON)	DNS

RANK	HEAT 2	TIME
1.	Worku Bikila (ETH)	13:32.93
2.	Paul Bitok (KEN)	13:36.81
3.	Brahim Boutayeb (MAR)	13:37.27
4.	Frank O'Mara (IRL)	13:38.79
5.	Reuben Reina (USA)	13:40.50
6.	Jonny Danielson (SWE)	13:43.91
7.	Raimundo Santos (POR)	13:48.06
8.	Hamid Sajjadi (IRI)	14:04.54
9.	Herder Vázquez (COL)	14:06.80
10.	José Luis Molina (CRC)	14:09.22
11.	Leo Garnes (BAR)	15:21.95
12.	Marlon Williams (ISV)	15:26.49
—	Evgeni Ignatov (BUL)	DNF
—	Husein Saleh Joaim (YEM)	DNS
—	Antonio Silio (ARG)	DNS

RANK	HEAT 3	TIME
1.	Dieter Baumann (GER)	13:20.82
2.	Rob Denmark (GBR)	13:22.41
3.	Mohamed Issangar (MAR)	13:22.98
4.	Dominic Kirui (KEN)	13:24.21
5.	Domingos Castro (POR)	13:24.57
6.	Antonio Serrano Sánchez (ESP)	13:42.94
7.	Tendai Chimusasa (ZIM)	13:50.16
8.	Bahadur Prasad (IND)	13:50.71
9.	Isaac Simelane (SWZ)	14:00.44
10.	Paul Donovan (IRL)	14:03.79
11.	Ignacio Fragoso (MEX)	14:16.14
12.	Abdullah Al-Dosari (BRN)	14:23.07
13.	Moussa Souleiman (DJI)	14:28.77
14.	Tello Namane (LES)	14:33.04
—	John Trautmann (USA)	DNF
—	Mwenze Kalombo (ZAI)	DNS

RANK	HEAT 4	TIME
1.	Salvatore Antibo (ITA)	13:33.71
2.	Bob Kennedy (USA)	13:35.76
3.	Marcel Versteeg (NED)	13:35.95
4.	Andrew Sambu (TAN)	13:36.99
5.	Ian Hamer (GBR)	13:40.20
6.	Addis Abebe (ETH)	13:40.76
7.	Martín Fiz (ESP)	13:42.20
8.	Andrey Tikhonov (EUN)	13:44.67
9.	Zachariah Ditetso (BOT)	13:54.88
10.	Carlos Monteiro (POR)	14:00.53
11.	Seraphin Mugabo (RWA)	14:25.97
12.	Ernest Ndjissipou (CAF)	14:40.12
13.	Awad Al-Hasini (JOR)	14:55.58
14.	Policarpio Calizaya (BOL)	15:02.02
—	Davendra Singh (FIJ)	DNS
—	Vincent Rousseau (BEL)	DNS

== Final ranking ==
Rank	Name	Nation
1st place, gold medalist(s)	Dieter Baumann	Germany
2nd place, silver medalist(s)	Paul Bitok	Kenya
3rd place, bronze medalist(s)	Fita Bayisa	Ethiopia
4	Brahim Boutayeb	Morocco
5	Yobes Ondieki	Kenya
6	Worku Bikila	Ethiopia
7	Robert Denmark	Great Britain
8	Abel Antón	Spain
9	Mohamed Issangar	Morocco
10	Andrew Sambu	Tanzania
11	Domingos Castro	Portugal
12	Bob Kennedy	United States
13	Pascal Thiébaut	France
14	Dominic Kirui	Kenya
15	Marcel Versteeg	Netherlands
16	Salvatore Antibo	Italy
17	Jack Buckner	Great Britain
18	Frank O'Mara	Ireland
19	Ian Hamer	Great Britain
20	Reuben Reina	United States
21	Addis Abebe	Ethiopia
22	John Doherty	Ireland
23	Martín Fiz	Spain
24	Antonio Serrano Sánchez	Spain
25	Jonny Danielson	Sweden
26	Andrey Tikhonov	Unified Team
27	Raimundo Santos	Portugal
28	Tendai Chimusasa	Zimbabwe
29	Bahadur Prasad	India
30	Risto Ulmala	Finland

Rank	Name	Nation
31	Zachariah Ditetso	Botswana
32	Mahmoud Kalboussi	Tunisia
33	Robbie Johnston	New Zealand
34	Isaac Simelane	Swaziland
35	Carlos Monteiro	Portugal
36	Brendan Matthias	Canada
37	Paul Donovan	Ireland
38	Hamid Sajjadi	Iran
39	Herder Vázquez	Colombia
40	Godfrey Siamusiye	Zambia
41	José Luis Molina	Costa Rica
42	Ignacio Fragoso	Mexico
43	Abdullah Al-Dosari	Bahrain
44	Seraphin Mugabo	Rwanda
45	Moussa Souleiman	Djibouti
46	Tello Namane	Lesotho
47	Ernest Ndjissipou	Central African Republic
48	Awad Al-Hasini	Jordan
49	Policarpio Calizaya	Bolivia
50	Aïssa Belaout	Algeria
51	Leo Garnes	Barbados
52	Marlon Williams	Virgin Islands
53	Tawai Keiruan	Vanuatu
54	Yussuf Moli Yesky	Chad

== See also ==
- 1990 Men's European Championships 5.000 metres (Split)
- 1991 Men's World Championships 5.000 metres (Tokyo)
- 1993 Men's World Championships 5.000 metres (Stuttgart)
- 1994 Men's European Championships 5.000 metres (Helsinki)
