= 1990 European Athletics Championships – Men's 5000 metres =

Men's 5000 metres at the European Athletics Championships

These are the official results of the Men's 5000 metres event at the 1990 European Athletics Championships in Split, Yugoslavia, held at Stadion Poljud on 30 August and 1 September 1990.

== Medalists ==
Gold	Salvatore Antibo; Italy
Silver	Gary Staines; United Kingdom
Bronze	Sławomir Majusiak; Poland

== Results ==
=== Final ===
1 September Italy's Salvatore Antibo, who was the strongest pre-race favourite to win also this final, having taken the 10,000-metre European title with a solo run, fell at the start, and therefore had to run faster than the other runners for the first 700 metres, in order to catch them. Portugal's Domingos Castro first led the race, but soon thereafter France's Cyrille Laventure took the lead. Laventure was still leading the race at 3,000 metres in 8:09.15, and at 4,000 metres in 10:53.34. Despite the moderate pace, almost all runners were still in the lead group at this point. On the second last back straight, Castro accelerated past Laventure into the lead, and the main group's runners started to string out. Castro was still leading the race at 4,600 metres, in an informal time of 12:26.2 or 12:26.3. Antibo, Britain's Gary Staines, Poland's Slawomir Majusiak, Laventure, and Finland's Risto Ulmala were chasing Castro. On the final back straight, Staines tried to sprint past Antibo, who accelerated into the lead, leaving Castro behind. At the start of the final bend, Staines sprinted past Antibo. In the second half of the bend, however, Antibo furiously kicked past Staines. Some metres behind the leading duo, Majusiak accelerated past the fading Castro. Several metres behind the second pair of runners, Sweden's Jonny Danielsson passed Ulmala. Despite celebrating his victory in the final metres, Antibo defeated Staines by almost half a second, while Majusiak secured the bronze medal. Danielsson ran the home straight several metres faster than the exhausted Castro, but he still lost to the tiny Portuguese runner by under 0.2 seconds. (The Big European Championships Book / Suuri EM-kirja (Finland, c. 1990); https://www.youtube.com/watch?v=8P_fSAPbYgM Salvatore Antibo vince i 5.000 a Spalato 90.)

Rank	Name	Nationality	Time	Notes
1st place, gold medalist(s)	Salvatore Antibo	Italy	13:22.00	
2nd place, silver medalist(s)	Gary Staines	United Kingdom	13:22.45	
3rd place, bronze medalist(s)	Sławomir Majusiak	Poland	13:22.92	
4	Dionísio Castro	Portugal	13:23.99	
5	Jonny Danielson	Sweden	13:24.16	
6	Risto Ulmala	Finland	13:25.08	
7	Stefano Mei	Italy	13:27.13	
8	Harri Hänninen	Finland	13:28.22	
9	Cyrille Laventure	France	13:28.25	
10	Carlos Monteiro	Portugal	13:30.19	
11	Abel Antón	Spain	13:31.27	
12	Ian Hamer	United Kingdom	13:32.61	
13	Eamonn Martin	United Kingdom	13:34.62	
14	Arnold Mächler	Switzerland	13:45.01	
	Marcus O'Sullivan	Ireland	DNF	

=== Heats ===
30 August

==== Heat 1 ====
Rank	Name	Nationality	Time	Notes
1	Sławomir Majusiak	Poland	13:40.12	Q
2	Salvatore Antibo	Italy	13:40.14	Q
3	Risto Ulmala	Finland	13:41.81	Q
4	Ian Hamer	United Kingdom	13:42.46	Q
5	Marcus O'Sullivan	Ireland	13:45.74	Q
6	Mikhail Dasko	Soviet Union	13:47.04	
7	Thierry Pantel	France	13:48.80	
8	Vincent Rousseau	Belgium	13:53.90	
9	António Leitão	Portugal	13:54.38	
10	Renato Gotti	Italy	14:05.30	
11	Pascal Thiébaut	France	14:07.13	
12	Steffen Brand	West Germany	14:12.84	
13	Marcel Versteeg	Netherlands	14:22.42	
14	Gerald De Gaetano	Malta	14:39.00	
15	Are Nakkim	Norway	14:42.16	
	Martín Fiz	Spain	DNF	
	Romeo Živko	Yugoslavia	DNF	

==== Heat 2 ====
Rank	Name	Nationality	Time	Notes
1	Gary Staines	United Kingdom	13:29.00	Q
2	Dionísio Castro	Portugal	13:29.03	Q
3	Arnold Mächler	Switzerland	13:29.09	Q
4	Carlos Monteiro	Portugal	13:29.16	Q
5	Stefano Mei	Italy	13:29.49	Q
6	Cyrille Laventure	France	13:29.58	q
7	Eamonn Martin	United Kingdom	13:29.62	q
8	Jonny Danielson	Sweden	13:29.65	q
9	Abel Antón	Spain	13:29.81	q
10	Harri Hänninen	Finland	13:30.05	q
11	John Halvorsen	Norway	13:35.58	
12	Evgeni Ignatov	Bulgaria	13:37.51	
13	Antonio Serrano	Spain	13:42.03	
14	Zeki Öztürk	Turkey	13:44.55	
15	Frank O'Mara	Ireland	13:59.44	

== Participation ==
According to an unofficial count, 32 athletes from 19 countries participated in the event.

- Belgium (1)
- Bulgaria (1)
- Finland (2)
- France (3)
- Ireland (2)
- Italy (3)
- Malta (1)
- Netherlands (1)
- Norway (2)
- Poland (1)
- Portugal (3)
- Soviet Union (1)
- Spain (3)
- Sweden (1)
- Switzerland (1)
- Turkey (1)
- United Kingdom (3)
- West Germany (1)
- Yugoslavia (1)

== See also ==
- 1988 Men's Olympic 5,000 metres (Seoul)
- 1991 Men's World Championships 5,000 metres (Tokyo)
- 1992 Men's Olympic 5,000 metres (Barcelona)
