= 1990 in the sport of athletics =

1990 in athletics
- Major world events: World Championships; World Indoor Championships

This article contains an overview of the year 1990 in athletics.

== International Events ==
- African Championships
- Asian Games
- Balkan Games
- Central American and Caribbean Championships
- Commonwealth Games
- European Championships
- European Indoor Championships
- Goodwill Games
- World Cross Country Championships
- World Junior Championships

== World records ==
=== Men ===
EVENT	ATHLETE	MARK	DATE	VENUE
20,000 metres	Dionísio Castro (POR)	57:18.4	31 March	La Flèche, France
4 × 100 m relay	France (FRA) • Max Morinière • Daniel Sangouma • Jean-Charles Trouabal • Bruno Marie-Rose	37.79	1 September	Split, Yugoslavia
Shot put	Randy Barnes (USA)	23.12m	20 May	Westwood, United States
Javelin (new)	Patrik Bodén (SWE)	89.10m	24 March	Austin, United States
Javelin (new)	Steve Backley (GBR)	89.58m	2 July	Stockholm, Sweden
Half marathon	Dionicio Cerón (MEX)	1:00:46	16 September	Philadelphia, United States

=== Women ===
EVENT	ATHLETE	MARK	DATE	VENUE
1,000 metres	Christine Wachtel (GER)	2:30.67	17 August	Berlin, Germany
Triple jump	Li Huirong (CHN)	14.54m	25 August	Sapporo, Japan

== Men's Best Year Performers ==
=== 100 metres ===
RANK	1990 WORLD BEST PERFORMERS	TIME
1.	Leroy Burrell (USA)	9.96
2.	Linford Christie (GBR)	10.02
3.	Calvin Smith (USA)	10.04
4.	Davidson Ezinwa (NGR)	10.05
4.	Mark Witherspoon (USA)	10.05
4.	Carl Lewis (USA)	10.05

=== 200 metres ===
RANK	1990 WORLD BEST PERFORMERS	TIME
1.	Michael Johnson (USA)	19.85
2.	Danny Everett (USA)	20.08
3.	John Regis (GBR)	20.11
4.	Leroy Burrell (USA)	20.14
5.	Robson da Silva (BRA)	20.23

=== 400 metres ===
RANK	1990 WORLD BEST PERFORMERS	TIME
1.	Danny Everett (USA)	44.06
2.	Roberto Hernández (CUB)	44.14
3.	Michael Johnson (USA)	44.21
4.	Andrew Valmon (USA)	44.35
5.	Darren Clark (AUS)	44.60

=== 800 metres ===
RANK	1990 WORLD BEST PERFORMERS	TIME
1.	Peter Elliott (GBR)	1:42.97
2.	William Tanui (KEN)	1:43.39
3.	Johnny Gray (USA)	1:43.72
4.	Paul Ereng (KEN)	1:43.78
5.	Robert Kibet (KEN)	1:44.29

=== 1,500 metres ===
RANK	1990 WORLD BEST PERFORMERS	TIME
1.	Noureddine Morceli (ALG)	3:32.60
2.	Peter Elliott (GBR)	3:32.69
3.	Gennaro Di Napoli (ITA)	3:32.78
4.	Wilfred Kirochi (KEN)	3:32.90
5.	Steve Cram (GBR)	3:33.03

=== Mile ===
RANK	1990 WORLD BEST PERFORMERS	TIME
1.	Joe Falcon (USA)	3:49.31
2.	Peter Elliott (GBR)	3:49.76
3.	Jens-Peter Herold (GDR)	3:50.59
4.	Tony Morrell (GBR)	3:51.31
5.	Abdi Bile (SOM)	3:52.01

=== 3,000 metres ===
RANK	1990 WORLD BEST PERFORMERS	TIME
1.	Khalid Skah (MAR)	7:37.09
2.	Cyrille Laventure (FRA)	7:37.74
3.	Yobes Ondieki (KEN)	7:38.15
4.	Mohamed Issangar (MAR)	7:39.40
5.	Brahim Boutayeb (MAR)	7:40.79

=== 5,000 metres ===
RANK	1990 WORLD BEST PERFORMERS	TIME
1.	Salvatore Antibo (ITA)	13:05.59
2.	Yobes Ondieki (KEN)	13:05.60
3.	Mohamed Issangar (MAR)	13:08.51
4.	Arturo Barrios (MEX)	13:08.52
5.	Khalid Skah (MAR)	13:09.55

=== 10,000 metres ===
RANK	1990 WORLD BEST PERFORMERS	TIME
1.	Arturo Barrios (MEX)	27:18.22
2.	John Ngugi (KEN)	27:19.15
3.	Salvatore Antibo (ITA)	27:25.16
4.	Hammou Boutayeb (MAR)	27:25.48
5.	Khalid Skah (MAR)	27:29.27

=== Half marathon ===
RANK	1990 WORLD BEST PERFORMERS	TIME
1.	Steve Moneghetti (AUS)	1:00:34

=== Marathon ===
RANK	1990 WORLD BEST PERFORMERS	TIME
1.	Steve Moneghetti (AUS)	2:08:16
2.	Gelindo Bordin (ITA)	2:08:19
3.	Gidamis Shahanga (TAN)	2:08:32
4.	Jörg Peter (GDR)	2:09:23
5.	Martín Pitayo (MEX)	2:09:41

=== 110m hurdles ===
RANK	1990 WORLD BEST PERFORMERS	TIME
1.	Colin Jackson (GBR)	13.08
2.	Greg Foster (USA)	13.15
3.	Roger Kingdom (USA)	13.21
3.	Tony Jarrett (GBR)	13.21
5.	Renaldo Nehemiah (USA)	13.22

=== 400m hurdles ===
RANK	1990 WORLD BEST PERFORMERS	TIME
1.	Danny Harris (USA)	47.49
2.	Samuel Matete (ZAM)	47.91
3.	Kriss Akabusi (GBR)	47.92
4.	Winthrop Graham (JAM)	48.03
5.	David Patrick (USA)	48.22

=== 3,000m steeplechase ===
RANK	1990 WORLD BEST PERFORMERS	TIME
1.	Peter Koech (KEN)	8:10.95
2.	Francesco Panetta (ITA)	8:12.66
3.	William Mutwol (KEN)	8:12.75
4.	Mark Rowland (GBR)	8:13.27
5.	Julius Kariuki (KEN)	8:13.28

=== High jump ===
RANK	1990 WORLD BEST PERFORMERS	HEIGHT
1.	Sorin Matei (ROU)	2.40
2.	Hollis Conway (USA)	2.38
3.	Dragutin Topić (YUG)	2.37
3.	Sergey Dymchenko (URS)	2.37
4.	Clarence Saunders (BER)	2.36
4.	Javier Sotomayor (CUB)	2.36
4.	Doug Nordquist (USA)	2.36
4.	Georgi Dakov (BUL)	2.36

=== Long jump ===
RANK	1990 WORLD BEST PERFORMERS	DISTANCE
1.	Mike Powell (USA)	8.66
2.	Jaime Jefferson (CUB)	8.53
3.	Carl Lewis (USA)	8.51
4.	Robert Emmiyan (URS)	8.32
5.	Sergey Podgainiy (URS)	8.25
5.	Dietmar Haaf (FRG)	8.25

=== Triple jump ===
RANK	1990 WORLD BEST PERFORMERS	DISTANCE
1.	Kenny Harrison (USA)	17.93
2.	Volodymyr Inozemtsev (URS)	17.90
3.	Oleg Protsenko (URS)	17.75
4.	Leonid Voloshin (URS)	17.74
5.	Mike Conley (USA)	17.56

=== Discus ===
RANK	1990 WORLD BEST PERFORMERS	DISTANCE
1.	Romas Ubartas (URS)	68.94
2.	Wolfgang Schmidt (GDR)	68.30
3.	Mike Buncic (USA)	67.72
4.	Juan Martínez Brito (CUB)	67.50
5.	Jürgen Schult (GDR)	67.08

=== Shot put ===
RANK	1990 WORLD BEST PERFORMERS	DISTANCE
1.	Randy Barnes (USA)	23.12 WR
2.	Ulf Timmermann (GER)	21.64
3.	Pétur Guðmundsson (ISL)	21.26
4.	Jim Doehring (USA)	21.20
5.	Oliver-Sven Buder (GER)	21.06

=== Hammer ===
RANK	1990 WORLD BEST PERFORMERS	DISTANCE
1.	Igor Nikulin (URS)	84.48
2.	Igor Astapkovich (URS)	84.14
3.	Andrey Abduvaliyev (URS)	83.46
4.	Yuriy Sedykh (URS)	82.80
5.	Sergey Litvinov (URS)	81.74

=== Javelin (new design) ===
RANK	1990 WORLD BEST PERFORMERS	DISTANCE
1.	Steve Backley (GBR)	89.58
2.	Patrik Bodén (SWE)	89.10
3.	Seppo Räty (FIN)	86.92
4.	Jan Železný (TCH)	86.52
5.	Tom Petranoff (USA)	86.46

=== Pole vault ===
RANK	1990 WORLD BEST PERFORMERS	HEIGHT
1.	Radion Gataullin (URS)	5.92
2.	Sergey Bubka (URS)	5.90
3.	Grigoriy Yegorov (URS)	5.87
4.	Maksim Tarasov (URS)	5.85
4.	Igor Potapovich (URS)	5.85

=== Decathlon ===
RANK	1990 WORLD BEST PERFORMERS	POINTS
1.	Christian Plaziat (FRA)	8574
2.	Michael Smith (CAN)	8525
3.	Christian Schenk (GDR)	8481
4.	Dezső Szabó (HUN)	8436
5.	Dave Johnson (USA)	8403

== Women's Best Year Performers ==
=== 60 metres ===
RANK	1990 WORLD BEST PERFORMERS	TIME
1.	Merlene Ottey (JAM)	7.08
2.	Ulrike Sarvari (FRG)	7.10
3.	Irina Sergeyeva (URS)	7.13
3.	Laurence Bily (FRA)	7.13
5.	Nelli Cooman (NLD)	7.14

=== 100 metres ===
RANK	1990 WORLD BEST PERFORMERS	TIME
1.	Merlene Ottey (JAM)	10.78
2.	Katrin Krabbe (GDR)	10.89
3.	Carlette Guidry (USA)	11.03
4.	Sheila Echols (USA)	11.05
4.	Michelle Finn (USA)	11.05

=== 200 metres ===
RANK	1990 WORLD BEST PERFORMERS	TIME
1.	Merlene Ottey (JAM)	21.66
2.	Katrin Krabbe (GDR)	21.95
3.	Heike Drechsler (GDR)	22.19
4.	Galina Malchugina (URS)	22.23
5.	Mary Onyali (NGR)	22.31

=== 400 metres ===
RANK	1990 WORLD BEST PERFORMERS	TIME
1.	Grit Breuer (GDR)	49.50
2.	Ana Fidelia Quirot (CUB)	50.03
3.	Paulien Davis (BAH)	50.05
4.	Petra Schersing (GDR)	50.31
5.	Lyudmila Dzhigalova (URS)	50.33

=== 800 metres ===
RANK	1990 WORLD BEST PERFORMERS	TIME
1.	Sigrun Wodars (GDR)	1:55.87
2.	Christine Wachtel (GDR)	1:56.11
3.	Nadezhda Loboyko (URS)	1:56.64
4.	Lyudmila Rogachova (URS)	1:57.1
5.	Liliya Nurutdinova (URS)	1:57.25

=== 1,500 metres ===
RANK	1990 WORLD BEST PERFORMERS	TIME
1.	Doina Melinte (ROU)	3:58.69
2.	Natalya Artyomova (URS)	4:02.53
3.	Yvonne Mai (GDR)	4:02.69
4.	Lyudmila Rogachova (URS)	4:03.07
5.	Violeta Beclea (ROM)	4:03.14

=== Mile ===
RANK	1990 WORLD BEST PERFORMERS	TIME
1.	Doina Melinte (ROU)	4:18.13
2.	Natalya Artyomova (URS)	4:22.20
3.	Yvonne Mai (GDR)	4:22.97
4.	Lynn Jennings (USA)	4:24.14
5.	Svetlana Kitova (URS)	4:24.63

=== 3,000 metres ===
RANK	1990 WORLD BEST PERFORMERS	TIME
1.	Angela Chalmers (CAN)	8:38.38
2.	Yvonne Murray (GBR)	8:39.46
3.	Liz McColgan (GBR)	8:43.14
4.	Yelena Romanova (URS)	8:43.68
5.	PattiSue Plumer (USA)	8:44.07

=== 5,000 metres ===
RANK	1990 WORLD BEST PERFORMERS	TIME
1.	Yelena Romanova (URS)	15:02.23
2.	Lynn Jennings (USA)	15:07.92
3.	PattiSue Plumer (USA)	15:07.97
4.	Viorica Ghican (ROU)	15:09.90
5.	Nadia Dandolo (ITA)	15:11.64

=== 10,000 metres ===
RANK	1990 WORLD BEST PERFORMERS	TIME
1.	Viorica Ghican (ROU)	31:18.18
2.	Uta Pippig (GDR)	31:40.92
3.	Maria Conceição Ferreira (POR)	31:45.75
4.	Yelena Romanova (URS)	31:46.83
5.	Kathrin Ullrich (GDR)	31:47.70

=== Half marathon ===
RANK	1990 WORLD BEST PERFORMERS	TIME
1.	Rosa Mota (POR)	1:09:33

=== Marathon ===
RANK	1990 WORLD BEST PERFORMERS	TIME
1.	Rosa Mota (POR)	2:25:24
2.	Lisa Martin (AUS)	2:25:28
3.	Wanda Panfil (POL)	2:26:31
4.	Frith van der Merwe (RSA)	2:27:36
5.	Francie Larrieu Smith (USA)	2:28:01

=== 60m hurdles ===
RANK	1990 WORLD BEST PERFORMERS	TIME
1.	Ludmila Narozhilenko (URS)	7.69
2.	Monique Éwanjé-Épée (FRA)	7.84
3.	Nataliya Grygoryeva (URS)	7.85
4.	Lidiya Yurkova (URS)	7.86
5.	Anne Piquereau (FRA)	7.88

=== 100m hurdles ===
RANK	1990 WORLD BEST PERFORMERS	TIME
1.	Nataliya Grygoryeva (URS)	12.53
2.	Monique Éwanjé-Épée (FRA)	12.56
3.	Ginka Zagorcheva (BUL)	12.61
4.	Mihaela Pogacian (ROU)	12.62
5.	Ludmila Narozhilenko (URS)	12.64

=== 400m hurdles ===
RANK	1990 WORLD BEST PERFORMERS	TIME
1.	Tatyana Ledovskaya (URS)	53.62
2.	Myrtle Bothma (RSA)	54.07
3.	Anita Protti (SUI)	54.36
4.	Sandra Farmer-Patrick (USA)	54.46
5.	Monica Westén (SWE)	54.69

=== High Jump ===
RANK	1990 WORLD BEST PERFORMERS	HEIGHT
1.	Yelena Yelesina (URS)	2.02 m
2.	Yolanda Henry (USA)	2.00 m
2.	Biljana Petrović (YUG)	2.00 m
2.	Heike Henkel (FRG)	2.00 m
5.	Alina Astafei (ROU)	1.98 m

=== Long Jump ===
RANK	1990 WORLD BEST PERFORMERS	DISTANCE
1.	Galina Chistyakova (URS)	7.35 m
2.	Heike Drechsler (GDR)	7.30 m
3.	Jackie Joyner-Kersee (USA)	7.12 m
4.	Inessa Kravets (URS)	7.10 m
4.	Larisa Berezhnaya (URS)	7.10 m

=== Triple Jump ===
RANK	1990 WORLD BEST PERFORMERS	DISTANCE
1.	Li Huirong (CHN)	14.54 m

=== Shot put ===
RANK	1990 WORLD BEST PERFORMERS	DISTANCE
1.	Sui Xinmei (CHN)	21.66 m
2.	Huang Zhihong (CHN)	21.52 m
3.	Astrid Kumbernuss (GER)	20.77 m

=== Javelin (old design) ===
RANK	1990 WORLD BEST PERFORMERS	DISTANCE
1.	Petra Felke (GDR)	73.08
2.	Zhang Li (CHN)	70.42
3.	Karen Forkel (GER)	69.38
4.	Xu Demei (CHN)	68.30
5.	Natalya Cherniyenko (URS)	67.88

=== Heptathlon ===
RANK	1990 WORLD BEST PERFORMERS	POINTS
1.	Jackie Joyner-Kersee (USA)	6783
2.	Jane Flemming (AUS)	6695
3.	Sabine Braun (GER)	6688
4.	Heike Tischler (GER)	6572
5.	Peggy Beer (GER)	6531

== Births ==
- February 1 — Feyisa Lilesa, Ethiopian long-distance runner
- August 29 — Marin Premeru, Croatian discus thrower and shot putter
- October 24 — Vicky Parnov, Australian pole vaulter
- November 23 — Stanislav Emelyanov, Russian race walker

== Deaths ==
- March 27 — Percy Beard (82), American hurdler (b. 1908)
- April 10 — Fortune Gordien (67), American athlete (b. 1922)
- August 29 — Luigi Beccali (82), Italian athlete (b. 1907)
- December 31 — Robina Higgins (75), Canadian athlete (b.1915)
