= Dominic Kirui =

Kenyan long-distance runner

Dominic Kirui (born 12 April 1967) is a retired Kenyan runner who specialized in cross country running. He was an individual silver medallist at the 1993 IAAF World Cross Country Championships. He represented his country on the track at the 1992 Summer Olympics and 1997 World Championships in Athletics.

In professional road running in the United States, he won the Crescent City Classic and Cooper River Bridge Run in 1992, the 2000 Azalea Trail Run and the 2001 Lilac Bloomsday Run.

== International competitions ==
Year	Competition	Venue	Position	Event	Notes
1992	World Cross Country Championships	Boston, United States	7th	Long race	
1992	World Cross Country Championships	Boston, United States	1st	Team competition	
1992	Olympic Games	Barcelona, Spain	14th	5000 metres	13:45.16
1993	World Cross Country Championships	Amorebieta, Spain	2nd	Long race	
1993	World Cross Country Championships	Amorebieta, Spain	1st	Team competition	
1994	World Cross Country Championships	Budapest, Hungary	12th	Long race	
1994	World Cross Country Championships	Budapest, Hungary	1st	Team competition	
1995	World Cross Country Championships	Durham, United Kingdom	142nd	Senior race	37:34
1995	World Cross Country Championships	Durham, United Kingdom	1st	Team	62 pts
1997	World Championships	Athens, Greece	12th	10,000 m	

== Personal bests ==
- 5000 metres – 13:33.77 min (1997)
- 10,000 metres – 27:31.10 min (1997)
- Half marathon – 1:02:45 hrs (2000)
