= Jon Brown (runner) =

British long-distance runner

Personal information
- Nationality: British (Welsh)/Canadian
- Born: 27 February 1971 (age 55) Bridgend, Wales
- Height: 175 cm (5 ft 9 in)
- Weight: 57 kg (126 lb)

Sport
- Sport: Athletics
- Event: Long-distance
- Club: City of Sheffield AC
Medal record
Athletics
Representing Great Britain
European Cross Country Championships
Gold medal – first place	1996 Oeiras	Individual
Gold medal – first place	1999 Velenje	Team
Bronze medal – third place	1995 Alnwick	Team
Bronze medal – third place	1999 Velenje	Individual

Jonathan Michael Brown (born 27 February 1971) is a former British long-distance runner who specialised in 10,000 metres, cross country running and the marathon and competed at three Olympics Games.

== Biography ==
Born in Bridgend, Wales, he was affiliated with the City of Sheffield Athletic Club in England during his career. He gained Canadian citizenship in 2005, after living in there since 1996; but continued to make himself available for Britain until switching sporting allegiance at the start of 2008.

Earlier in his running career he competed for the Iowa State Cyclones Track and Field and Iowa State Cyclones Cross Country teams. He was a bronze medallist in the 5000 m at the 1992 European Athletics U23 Cup.

Brown became the British 5000 metres champion after winning the British AAA Championships title at the 1993 AAA Championships.

He won the 1996 European Cross Country Championships and is a three-time Olympian; who placed fourth in two successive Olympic Games whilst representing Great Britain. He twice represented Britain at the World Championships in Athletics, running the 5000 metres in 1993 and 10,000 metres in 1999. He was also a five-time participant at the IAAF World Cross Country Championships, his best finish being eighth place in 1999. At the 1994 Goodwill Games he took the 5000 m bronze medal. He was also a close fourth at the 1998 European Athletics Championships 10,000 m, two and a half seconds behind Germany's Stéphane Franke.

Brown participated in the 1996 Atlanta Olympic 10,000 metres where he placed tenth (27:59.74). This was followed by the marathon at the 2000 Sydney Olympics, where he placed fourth, and also in the 2004 Athens Olympics, where he was again fourth in the marathon. In the former race he missed third place by seven seconds and in the latter by fifteen seconds.

His personal best times for the 10K run (27:20 minutes) and the 15K run (42:39 minutes) were the fastest by any European runner, but they have not been ratified as European records. His 10K time is still the fastest, while his 15K time has since been beaten by Julien Wanders, who also holds the official European 10K record.

He has won several road races on the circuit including the 1996 Gasparilla Distance Classic and the 1999 San Silvestre Vallecana. He was also successful at cross country meetings in Spain, winning at the 1996 Cross Internacional Valle de Llodio, 1997 Cross Internacional Juan Muguerza and the 1999 Cross de San Sebastián.

== International competitions ==
Year	Competition	Venue	Position	Event	Notes
Representing Great Britain
1990	World Junior Championships	Plovdiv, Bulgaria	13th	5000m	14:03.09
2000	Olympic Games	Sydney, Australia	4th	Marathon	2:11:17
2004	Olympic Games	Athens, Greece	4th	Marathon	2:12:26

== Personal bests ==
- 1500 metres (track) – 3:40.53 min (1992)
- 3000 metres (track) – 7:45.41 min (1998)
- 5,000 metres (track) – 13:19.03 min (1998)
- 10,000 metres (track) – 27:18.14 min (1998)
- 15 km (road) – 42:39 min (1994)
- Half marathon – 1:01:49 hrs (1997)
- Marathon – 2:09:31 hrs (2005)
