= 1990 World Junior Championships in Athletics – Men's 5000 metres =

The men's 5000 metres event at the 1990 World Junior Championships in Athletics was held in Plovdiv, Bulgaria, at Deveti Septemvri Stadium on 9 and 11 August.

== Medalists ==
Gold	Fita Bayissa; Ethiopia
Silver	Abraham Assefa; Ethiopia
Bronze	Francesco Bennici; Italy

== Results ==
=== Final ===
11 August

Rank	Name	Nationality	Time	Notes
1st place, gold medalist(s)	Fita Bayissa	Ethiopia	13:42.59	
2nd place, silver medalist(s)	Abraham Assefa	Ethiopia	13:44.63	
3rd place, bronze medalist(s)	Francesco Bennici	Italy	13:47.10	
4	Meta Petro	Tanzania	13:48.91	
5	Paul Patrick	Australia	13:51.52	
6	Stefano Baldini	Italy	13:54.38	
7	Jan Pešava	Czechoslovakia	13:55.02	
8	Juma Ninga	Tanzania	13:55.52	
9	Ryuji Takei	Japan	13:55.78	
10	Muchapiwa Mazano	Zimbabwe	13:56.97	
11	Ion Avramescu	Romania	13:59.34	
12	Dmitriy Drozdov	Soviet Union	14:01.60	
13	Jon Brown	United Kingdom	14:03.09	
14	Richard Potts	New Zealand	14:15.80	
15	Mohamed Riad	Morocco	14:17.56	

=== Heats ===
9 August

==== Heat 1 ====
Rank	Name	Nationality	Time	Notes
1	Juma Ninga	Tanzania	14:06.60	Q
2	Abraham Assefa	Ethiopia	14:08.54	Q
3	Stefano Baldini	Italy	14:11.09	Q
4	Ryuji Takei	Japan	14:11.22	Q
5	Ion Avramescu	Romania	14:11.52	Q
6	Jon Brown	United Kingdom	14:11.61	q
7	Mohamed Riad	Morocco	14:12.56	q
8	Dmitriy Drozdov	Soviet Union	14:15.12	q
9	Jason Bunston	Canada	14:22.20	
10	Claes Nyberg	Sweden	14:26.11	
11	Anthony Kiprono	Kenya	14:28.26	
12	Elias Couto	Portugal	14:33.54	
13	Abdel Krim Benzai	Algeria	14:34.57	
14	Piotr Gladki	Poland	14:37.48	
15	Javier Cortés	Spain	14:40.19	
16	Mugah Al-Maslemany	North Yemen	16:10.76	

==== Heat 2 ====
Rank	Name	Nationality	Time	Notes
1	Fita Bayissa	Ethiopia	13:53.80	Q
2	Meta Petro	Tanzania	14:02.08	Q
3	Francesco Bennici	Italy	14:02.49	Q
4	Jan Pešava	Czechoslovakia	14:02.81	Q
5	Richard Potts	New Zealand	14:09.74	Q
6	Paul Patrick	Australia	14:16.42	q
7	Muchapiwa Mazano	Zimbabwe	14:17.52	q
8	William Kalya	Kenya	14:17.77	
9	Luis Suárez	Spain	14:36.33	
10	Germano Neves	Portugal	14:38.98	
11	Stanislav Yordanov	Soviet Union	14:42.00	
12	Jarosław Cichocki	Poland	14:50.01	
13	Abdullah Yousef Abdullah	Qatar	15:00.11	
14	Christophe Van Der Meersch	Belgium	15:00.98	
15	Bryan Conway	Ireland	15:18.18	
16	Khalid Al-Estashi	North Yemen	15:59.66	
	Salah Hissou	Morocco	DNF	
	Yasuyuki Watanabe	Japan	DNF	

== Participation ==
According to an unofficial count, 34 athletes from 23 countries participated in the event.

- Algeria (1)
- Australia (1)
- Belgium (1)
- Canada (1)
- Czechoslovakia (1)
- Ethiopia (2)
- Ireland (1)
- Italy (2)
- Japan (2)
- Kenya (2)
- Morocco (2)
- New Zealand (1)
- North Yemen (2)
- Poland (2)
- Portugal (2)
- Qatar (1)
- Romania (1)
- Soviet Union (2)
- Spain (2)
- Sweden (1)
- Tanzania (2)
- United Kingdom (1)
- Zimbabwe (1)
