= Ian Hamer (athlete) =

British long-distance runner

Personal information
- Born: 18 July 1965 (age 60) Bridgend, Glamorgan, Wales
- Height: 173 cm (5 ft 8 in)
- Weight: 61 kg (134 lb)

Sport
- Sport: Athletics
- Event: 5000 metres
- Club: Swansea Harriers
- Coached by: Mark Rowland (1992)

Ian Martin Hamer (born 18 July 1965) is a British former long-distance runner. He competed in the 1992 Summer Olympics.

== Biography ==
Hamer was the bronze medallist in the 5000 metres at the 1990 Commonwealth Games.

hamer finished third behind Eamonn Martin and Rob Denmark in the 5,000 metres event at the 1991 AAA Championships.

== International competitions ==
Year	Competition	Venue	Position	Event	Notes
Representing Great Britain and Wales
1990	Commonwealth Games	Auckland, New Zealand	9th	1500 m	3:46.23
1990	Commonwealth Games	Auckland, New Zealand	3rd	5000 m	13:25.63
1990	European Indoor Championships	Glasgow, United Kingdom	7th	3000 m	7:58.15
1990	European Championships	Split, Yugoslavia	12th	5000 m	13:32.61
1991	World Championships	Tokyo, Japan	13th (h)	5000 m	13:54.49
1992	Olympic Games	Barcelona, Spain	19th (h)	5000 m	13:40.20
1992	World Cup	Havana, Cuba	4th	10,000 m	29:14.05

== Personal bests ==
Outdoor

- 1500 metres – 3:38.9h (Cwmbran 1989)
- One mile – 3:56.19 (Cork 1991)
- 3000 metres – 7:46.40 (Auckland 1990)
- 2 miles – 8:22.65 (Gateshead 1992)
- 5000 metres – 13:09.80 (Rome 1992)
- 10.000 metres – 7:57.77 (Brussels 1991)

Indoor

- 3000 metres – 7:51.49 (Birmingham 1992)
