= Tello Namane =

Personal information
- Nationality: Lesotho
- Born: 15 January 1974 (age 52)

Sport
- Sport: Long-distance running
- Event: 5000 metres

Tello Namane (born 15 January 1974) is a Lesotho long-distance runner. He competed in the men's 5000 metres at the 1992 Summer Olympics.
