= Eric Holt =

American middle-distance runner (born 1995)

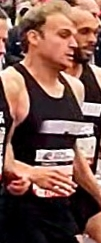
- Holt at the 2024 Penn Relays

Personal information
- Born: May 12, 1995 (age 31) Hoffman Estates, Illinois, U.S.
- Education: Binghamton University
- Height: 6 ft 1 in (185 cm)

Sport
- Sport: Track and field
- Events: 1500 m, Mile
- University team: Binghamton Bearcats
- Club: Empire Elite Track Club

Achievements and titles
- Personal bests: 1500 m: 3:32.95 (Eugene 2025); Mile: 3:51.46 (Philadelphia 2024); Indoor; 1000 m: 2:17.25 (New York City 2024); 1500 m: 3:36.85 (Boston 2024); Mile: 3:52.35 (Boston 2024)
Medal record
Men's track and field
Representing United States
NACAC Championships
Gold medal – first place	Freeport 2022	1500 m

Eric Holt (born 12 May 1995) is an American middle-distance runner who specializes in the 1500 metres. He is a member of the Empire Elite Track Club, a training group based in New York City, and is the 2022 NACAC 1500 m champion.

Eric was born in Illinois and grew up in Carmel, New York, where he starred on the Carmel High School cross country and track and field teams.

== Athletics career ==
=== High school ===
In 2013, during his senior year of high school at Carmel High School, Holt won the New York state title in the 1600 m in 4:07.00 and ran a 3200 m personal best of 9:00.20.

=== Binghamton and post-collegiate ===
From 2013 to 2018, Holt competed for Binghamton University in cross country and track and field. He never qualified for the NCAA Championships, but ran a mile personal best of 4:00.65 during his redshirted fourth year in 2017 and won 6 America East Conference titles.

After graduating college, Holt received no interest from professional training groups but continued to train while working as a mental health worker at a psychiatric ward in Westchester County, New York. He often ran workouts at late hours of the night after long shifts, which he claimed made him "incredibly mentally tough". Under this unorthodox training regimen, Holt broke the four-minute barrier in the mile for the first time in 2019, winning the Monmouth Mile in 3:58.88.

=== Empire Elite ===
In 2021, he caught the attention of coaches Tom Nohilly and John Trautmann, who invited him to join their newly formed Empire Elite Track Club, the successor to the former New Jersey New York Track Club. Later that year, Holt ran a 3:36.62 1500 m personal best at the Portland Track Festival and reached the semi-finals of the 2020 United States Olympic trials, before being eliminated.

At the 2022 US Championships, Holt finished fourth, and later that summer, represented the United States at the NACAC Championships in the Bahamas, where he won gold ahead of Josh Thompson and Charles Philibert-Thiboutot in a championship record of 3:37.62.

Ahead of the 2023 US Championships, Holt took first in the 1500 m at the USATF NYC Grand Prix in a seasons best of 3:37.07. At USAs in July, Holt qualified for the final, but finished last in 3:37.63. Later that month, Holt ran a 3:34.50 lifetime best to win the Under Armour Sunset Tour in Los Angeles.

At the 2024 NYC Grand Prix, Holt ran a personal best of 3:34.05 to earn second place. Holt qualified for the 2024 US Olympic Trials in the 1500 m and 800 m events. His coaches shared that Empire Elite is “maxing out the credit cards right now" to pay for Holt's training.

On June 26, in between his 1500m and 800m races at the US Olympic Trials, Holt announced that he had signed a deal with Puma.

== Competition record ==
Year	Competition	Venue	Position	Event	Notes
2019	USA Indoor Track and Field Championships	Staten Island, New York	H3 8th	1,000 m	2:27.81
2020	USA Indoor Track and Field Championships	Albuquerque, New Mexico	9th	1,500 m	3:53.93
2021	US Olympic Trials	Eugene, Oregon	SF1 8th	1,500 m	3:39.83
2022	2022 USA Indoor Track and Field Championships	The Podium; Spokane, Washington	11th	1,500 m	3:46.87
2022	USA Outdoor Track and Field Championships	Hayward Field; Eugene, Oregon	4th	1,500 m	3:46.15
2023	USA Outdoor Track and Field Championships	Hayward Field; Eugene, Oregon	12th	1,500 m	3:37.63
2024	2024 USA Indoor Track and Field Championships	Albuquerque Convention Center; Albuquerque, New Mexico	11th	1,500 m	3:44.97
2024	US Olympic Trials	Hayward Field; Eugene, Oregon	SF1 11th	1,500 m	3:39.45
2024	US Olympic Trials	Hayward Field; Eugene, Oregon	SF3 DQ	800 m	N/A
2025	USA Outdoor Track and Field Championships	Hayward Field; Eugene, Oregon	12th	1,500 m	3:40.29

== Personal life ==
Holt is the youngest of four children and has three older sisters. He lived with his parents for a time due to him being unsponsored for most of his career.
