= Moli Yeski Yusef =

Chadian runner

Moli Yeski Yusef (born circa 1965) is a middle distance and long distance athlete who competed internationally for Chad.

== Early life ==
Yusef was born on his parents' farm in Chad. He is estimated to have been born circa 1965, but he was described as of "indeterminate age" and could only guess he was around 30 years old in 1996 due to inadequate record-keeping. After spending the 1989 season running for Coffeyville Community College in Kansas, Yusef first came to Albuquerque, New Mexico to do altitude training in 1993, training with local coach Mike Mittelstaedt. Yusuf hoped to earn an athletic scholarship and attempted to convince local coaches based on past times he claimed to have run, including a 5K run time of 13:27 at a junior cross country championship in Algeria in the 1980s.

Mittelstaedt eventually ended his relationship with Yusef due to poor running performance. Yusef went on run at Navajo Community College in 1995, but the track coach there also said that Yusef's purported running qualifications did not match up with his performance. Yusef claimed that the discrepancy was only due to adjusting to high altitude and injuries. Yusef said of his accomplishments, "I am the best runner in my country... I hold seven national records. I have run in three Olympic Games and four Pan-African Games... I just want people to respect me."

Yusuf did not run road races, claiming that hard surfaces hurt his legs so he would only participate in track and field and cross country running. He spent some time in Atlanta, Georgia, in 1996, attempting in vain to be recruited by the Georgia Tech Yellow Jackets track and field team before he returned to Albuquerque and was trained by New Mexico Lobos track and field coach Mike MacEachen.

Because Yusuf was from Chad, he was stereotyped and Americans told him he was in the U.S. illegally.

== Career ==
Yusef first represented Chad at the 1988 Summer Olympics in Seoul, where he competed in the 800 metres. He claimed to have advanced to the second round, but official results show he finished eighth in his heat and failed to advance. Four years later, he competed in the 5000 metres at the 1992 Summer Olympics held in Barcelona, where he finished 14th in his heat and again did not advance.

According to the Albuquerque Journal, Yusuf also claimed to have competed in the 5000 m at the 1996 Atlanta Olympics, where he was eliminated in the preliminary heats running only about 15:20. However, official results do not list his participation at the 1996 Games.

== Personal life ==
Yusef wanted to study political science in college, saying that he wanted to "go back to Africa... and help throw out all the dictators". His idol was Olympic gold medalist middle-distance runner Sebastian Coe.
