= Abdullah Al-Dosari (runner) =

Bahraini long-distance runner

Personal information
- Full name: Abdullah Hussein Al-Dosari
- Nationality: Bahraini
- Born: 19 April 1965 (age 60)

Sport
- Sport: Long-distance running
- Event: 5000 metres

Abdullah Hussein Al-Dosari (born 19 April 1965) is a Bahraini long-distance runner who placed 43rd in the men's 5000 metres at the 1992 Summer Olympics.

Al-Dosari won the silver medal in the 2000 m steeplechase at the 1986 Asian Junior Athletics Championships. He made his Olympic debut in the 3000 m steeplechase at the 1988 Olympics, running 9:10.85 and becoming the only person from his heat not to advance.

He returned at the 1992 Summer Olympics to finish 43rd in the 5000 m. He also started the 10,000 m but did not finish the race. He won the inaugural half-marathon at the 1992 GCC Athletics Championships. At the 1997 IAAF World Half Marathon Championships, Al-Dosari finished 121st in 1:08:48.

Al-Dosari later became the head of activities and events at the Qatar Athletics Federation.
