= Athletics at the 1993 Summer Universiade – Men's 10,000 metres =

The men's 10,000 metres event at the 1993 Summer Universiade was held at the UB Stadium in Buffalo, United States on 16 July 1993.

== Results ==
Rank	Athlete	Nationality	Time	Notes
1st place, gold medalist(s)	Antonio Serrano	Spain	28:16.16	
2nd place, silver medalist(s)	Yasuyuki Watanabe	Japan	28:17.26	
3rd place, bronze medalist(s)	Vincenzo Modica	Italy	28:17.73	
4	Stephen Mayaka	Kenya	28:18.29	
5	Joseph Otwori	Kenya	28:22.68	
6	Peter Sherry	United States	28:36.66	
7	Christian Leuprecht	Italy	28:50.38	
8	Azzeddine Sakhri	Algeria	28:57.94	
9	Martin Jones	Great Britain	28:58.87	
10	Pablo Sierra	Spain	29:25.59	
11	Abel Lekgari	South Africa	29:34.14	
12	David Walsh	United States	29:45.67	
13	Phil Costley	New Zealand	30:44.00	
14	Dmitriy Silantiyev	Russia	31:16.02	
15	Lenin Guerra	Ecuador	31:16.98	
16	Mohamed El-Mesbahi	Morocco	31:45.62	
	Stephen Phofi	South Africa	DNF	
	Fatih Çintimar	Turkey	DNF	
	Bizuneh Yae	Ethiopia	DNF	
	Sergey Fedotov	Russia	DNF	
	Conor Holt	Ireland	DNF	
