= Seraphin Mugabo =

Rwandan long-distance runner

Personal information
- Nationality: Rwandan
- Born: 8 February 1968 (age 58)

Sport
- Sport: Long-distance running
- Event: 5000 metres

Seraphin Mugabo (born 8 February 1968) is a Rwandan long-distance runner. He competed in the men's 5000 metres at the 1992 Summer Olympics.
