= 1999 New York City Marathon =

Footrace held in New York City

30th New York City Marathon
- Venue: New York City, New York
- Date: November 7

Champions
- Men: Joseph Chebet (2:09:14)
- Women: Adriana Fernández (2:25:06)

The 1999 New York City Marathon was the 30th running of the annual marathon race in New York City, New York, which took place on Sunday, November 7. The men's elite race was won by Kenya's Joseph Chebet in a time of 2:09:14 hours while the women's race was won by Mexico's Adriana Fernández in 2:25:06.

A total of 31,786 runners finished the race, 22,626 men and 9160 women.

== Results ==
=== Men ===
Position	Athlete	Nationality	Time
1st place, gold medalist(s)	Joseph Chebet	Kenya	2:09:14
2nd place, silver medalist(s)	Domingos Castro	Portugal	2:09:20
3rd place, bronze medalist(s)	Shem Kororia	Kenya	2:09:32
4	Giacomo Leone	Italy	2:09:36
5	John Kagwe	Kenya	2:09:39
6	Elijah Lagat	Kenya	2:09:59
7	Abdelkader El Mouaziz	Morocco	2:10:28
8	Simon Biwott	Kenya	2:11:25
9	Martín Fiz	Spain	2:12:03
10	Silvio Guerra	Ecuador	2:13:24
11	Danilo Goffi	Italy	2:14:25
12	Samuel Otieno	Kenya	2:14:48
13	Zebedayo Bayo	Tanzania	2:16:15
14	Frank Pooe	South Africa	2:17:12
15	Jackson Kabiga	Kenya	2:17:57
16	Roberto Antonelli	Italy	2:20:22
17	James Bungei	Kenya	2:20:42
18	Arsenio Ortiz	Mexico	2:21:35
19	Stuart Hall	United Kingdom	2:21:48
20	William Kiptum	Kenya	2:22:06
—	Cosmas Ndeti	Kenya	DNF
—	Germán Silva	Mexico	DNF
—	Bedaso Turbe	Ethiopia	DNF
—	Luketz Swartbooi	Namibia	DNF
—	Luis Carlos Fernandes Silva	Brazil	DNF
—	Leonid Shvetsov	Russia	DNF
—	Róbert Štefko	Slovakia	DNF
—	João N'Tyamba	Angola	DNF

=== Women ===
Position	Athlete	Nationality	Time
1st place, gold medalist(s)	Adriana Fernández	Mexico	2:25:06
2nd place, silver medalist(s)	Catherine Ndereba	Kenya	2:27:34
3rd place, bronze medalist(s)	Katrin Dörre-Heinig	Germany	2:28:41
4	Franca Fiacconi	Italy	2:29:49
5	Irina Timofeyeva	Russia	2:31:21
6	Anuța Cătună	Romania	2:32:05
7	Alina Gherasim	Romania	2:36:23
8	Márcia Narloch	Brazil	2:37:13
9	Margaret Kagiri	Kenya	2:38:10
10	Zofia Wieciorkowska	Poland	2:43:24
11	Gillian Horovitz	United Kingdom	2:46:16
12	Kimberly Griffin	United States	2:48:29
14	Anna-Maria Venturelli	Italy	2:55:33
15	Emanuela Doddi	Italy	2:56:14
16	Jane Johnson	United States	2:57:59
17	Aurora Perez	Spain	2:58:32
18	Laurel Kjorlien	Canada	2:59:16
—	Patricia Jardon	Mexico	DNF
—	Firaya Sultanova-Zhdanova	Russia	DNF
—	Lori Stich	United States	DNF
