= Fita Bayisa =

Ethiopian long-distance runner

Personal information
- Born: December 15, 1972 (age 53)
Medal record
Men's athletics
Representing Ethiopia
Olympic Games
Bronze medal – third place	1992 Barcelona	5000 metres
World Championships
Silver medal – second place	1991 Tokyo	5000 m
Bronze medal – third place	1993 Stuttgart	5000 m
All-Africa Games
Gold medal – first place	1991 Cairo	5000 m
African Championships
Silver medal – second place	1993 Durban	10,000 m
Bronze medal – third place	1998 Dakar	3000 m
World Junior Championships
Gold medal – first place	1990 Plovdiv	5000 m

Fita Bayisa (Amharic: ፊጣ ባይሳ; born December 15, 1972, in Ambo, Oromia) is an Ethiopian long-distance runner, best known for winning a bronze medal in the 5,000 metres event at the 1992 Summer Olympics. A year earlier, he had won a silver medal at the World Championships in Tokyo. Before the Olympic Games in Barcelona, Bayisa had emerged as the favourite for 10,000 metres, as he had defeated a world-class field at the Bislett Games in Oslo in a time of 27:14.26 min. However, he failed to make an impact on the 10,000 m final, which was won by Khalid Skah.

Among his other achievements, he was the winner of the 1999 Belgrade Race Through History. He beat Paul Tergat by a second in the unusual race across Belgrade's city fortress.

Bayisa was the flag bearer for Ethiopia in the Atlanta 1996 opening ceremony.

== Personal bests ==
- 1500 metres - 3:35.35 (1999)
- 3000 metres - 7:35.32 (1996)
- 5000 metres - 13:05.40 (1993)
- 10,000 metres - 27:14.26 (1992)
- 8 kilometres - 22:22 (2000)
- 5 miles road - 22:29 (2000)

== Achievements ==
Year	Competition	Venue	Position	Event	Notes
Representing Ethiopia
1990	World Junior Championships	Plovdiv, Bulgaria	1st	5,000 m	13:42.59
1991	World Championships	Tokyo, Japan	2nd	5,000 m	13:16.64
1991	All-Africa Games	Cairo, Egypt	1st	5,000 m	13:36.91
1992	World Cross Country Championships	Boston, United States	3rd	Cross (12.53 km)	37:18
1992	Summer Olympics	Barcelona, Spain	3rd	5,000 m	13:13.03
1992	IAAF World Cup	Havana, Cuba	1st	5,000 m	13:41.23
1993	World Championships	Stuttgart, Germany	3rd	5,000 m	13:05.40
1993	African Championships	Durban, South Africa	3rd	10,000 m	27:26.90
1997	World Championships	Athens, Greece	10th	5,000 m	13:25.98
2000	Olympic Games	Sydney, Australia	4th	5,000 m	13:37.03

Olympic Games
Preceded by unknown	Flagbearer for Ethiopia; Atlanta 1996	Succeeded by Derartu Tulu
