= Brendan Matthias =

Canadian long-distance runner

Personal information
- Full name: Brendan Arthur Matthias
- Born: 12 August 1969 (age 57) Toronto, Canada

Sport
- Sport: Long-distance running
- Event: 5000 metres

Brendan Arthur Matthias (born 12 August 1969) is a Canadian long-distance runner. He competed in the men's 5000 metres at the 1992 Summer Olympics.
