= Mohamed Issangar =

Moroccan long-distance runner

Medal record

Men's athletics

Representing Morocco

World Cross Country Championships
Silver medal – second place	1994 Budapest	Long race – Team

African Championships
Bronze medal – third place	1988 Annaba	5000 m
Bronze medal – third place	1990 Cairo	5000 m

Mohamed Issangar (born 12 December 1964) is a retired Moroccan long-distance runner who specialized in the 5000 metres.

He competed at the 1991 World Championships without reaching the final, finished ninth at the 1992 Olympic Games, and fourth in the 1993 IAAF Grand Prix Final. He finished sixteenth at the 1994 World Cross Country Championships, and for this he won a silver medal with the Moroccan team in the team competition. This was the first team medal claimed by Morocco in this event.

On the regional level he won the bronze medal at the 1989 Jeux de la Francophonie, behind countryfellows Saïd Aouita and Khalid Skah. This was one of three all-Moroccan podiums in this event at the Jeux de la Francophonie (the other being 1994: Salah Hissou, Brahim Lahlafi, Brahim Jabbour and 2001: Mohamed Amine, Abderrahim Goumri, Mohamed Saïd El Wardi). Issangar also won bronze medals at the 1988 and 1990 African Championships.

His personal best times were 3.57.03 minutes in the mile run, achieved in August 1990 in Monaco; 7.39.30 minutes in the 3000 metres, achieved in August 1993 in Köln; 13.08.51 minutes in the 5000 metres, achieved in July 1990 in London; and 1.02.18 hours in the half marathon, achieved in March 1992 in Aïn Sebaâ.
