= Zachariah Ditetso =

Botswana long-distance runner

Personal information
- Nationality: Botswana
- Born: 8 August 1964 (age 61)

Sport
- Sport: Long-distance running
- Event: 5000 metres

Zachariah Ditetso (born 8 August 1964) is a Botswana long-distance runner. He competed in the men's 5000 metres at the 1992 Summer Olympics.
