= Gianni Crepaldi =

Italian long-distance runner

Personal information
- Full name: Giovanni Crepaldi
- Nationality: Italian
- Born: 19 October 1968 (age 57)

Sport
- Country: Italy
- Sport: Athletics
- Event(s): Long-distance running 3000 m steeplechase

Achievements and titles
- Personal best: 3000 m st: 8:27.22 (1995)

Gianni Crepaldi (born 19 October 1968) is a former Italian male long-distance runner who competed at six editions of the IAAF World Cross Country Championships at senior level (1995, 1997, 2000, 2002, 2004, 2005). He won one national championships at senior level (3000 m steeplechase: 1993).
