= Antonio Serrano (runner) =

Spanish long-distance runner

Personal information
- Born: 8 March 1965 (age 61) La Solana, Spain

Sport
- Sport: Track and field
Medal record
Representing Spain
Summer Universiade
Gold medal – first place	1993 Buffalo	10,000m
Bronze medal – third place	1989 Duisburg	5000m
Bronze medal – third place	1989 Duisburg	10,000m

Antonio Serrano Sánchez (born 8 March 1965) is a Spanish retired long-distance runner who specialized in the 10,000 metres and road running.

== Achievements ==
Year	Competition	Venue	Position	Event	Notes
Representing Spain
1988	Ibero-American Championships	Mexico City, Mexico	3rd	5000m	14:41.75 A
1989	Universiade	Duisburg, West Germany	3rd	5000 m	13:39.50
1989	Universiade	Duisburg, West Germany	3rd	10,000 m	28:43.97
1990	European Championships	Split, Yugoslavia	18th (h)	5000m	13:42.03
1990	Ibero-American Championships	Manaus, Brazil	1st	5000m	13:56.37
1991	World Cross Country Championships	Antwerp, Belgium	37th	Long race (11.764 km)	35:10
1991	World Cross Country Championships	Antwerp, Belgium	3rd	Team	198 pts
1991	Universiade	Sheffield, United Kingdom	5th	5000 m	13:42.70
1992	World Cup	Havana, Cuba	2nd	10,000 m	28:54.38
1993	Universiade	Buffalo, United States	1st	10,000 m	28:16.16
1993	World Championships	Stuttgart, Germany	11th	10,000 m	29:04.10
1994	European Championships	Helsinki, Finland	16th	10,000 m	28:31.75
1995	World Cross Country Championships	Durham, United Kingdom	19th	Long race (12.02 km)	35:07
1995	World Cross Country Championships	Durham, United Kingdom	3rd	Team	120 pts
1995	World Half Marathon Championships	Montbéliard–Belfort, France	4th	Half marathon	1:01:56
1995	World Half Marathon Championships	Montbéliard–Belfort, France	2nd	Team	3:07:51
1997	Venice Marathon	Venice, Italy	1st	Marathon	2:11:59
1998	European Championships	Budapest, Hungary	12th	Marathon	2:14:58

=== Personal bests ===
- 3000 metres – 7:47.73 (13/09/1989, Jerez de la Frontera)
- 5000 metres – 13:22.40 (30/05/1991, Seville)
- 10,000 metres – 27:47.33 (20/06/1993, Hengelo)
- Half marathon – 1:01:30 (28/03/1998, The Hague)
- Marathon – 2h09:13 (25/09/1994, Berlin)
