= Gerald Degaetano =

Maltese middle-distance runner (1964–2018)

Gerald Degaetano (12 January 1964 - 8 January 2018) was a Maltese middle-distance runner who in 1989 won Malta's first medal at the Games of the Small States of Europe.
