= Carlos Grisales =

Colombian long-distance runner

Carlos Mario Grisales (born 24 August 1966) is a retired Colombian long-distance runner who specialized in the marathon. He is a two-time Olympian.

== Achievements ==
Year	Tournament	Venue	Result	Event
1996	Olympic Games	Atlanta, United States	11th	Marathon
1997	Central American and Caribbean Championships	San Juan, Puerto Rico	2nd	Half marathon
2003	World Championships	Paris, France	54th	Marathon

=== Personal bests ===
- Half marathon – 1:02:43 hours (1997)
- Marathon – 2:11:17 hours (1996)
