= John Trautmann =

American long-distance runner

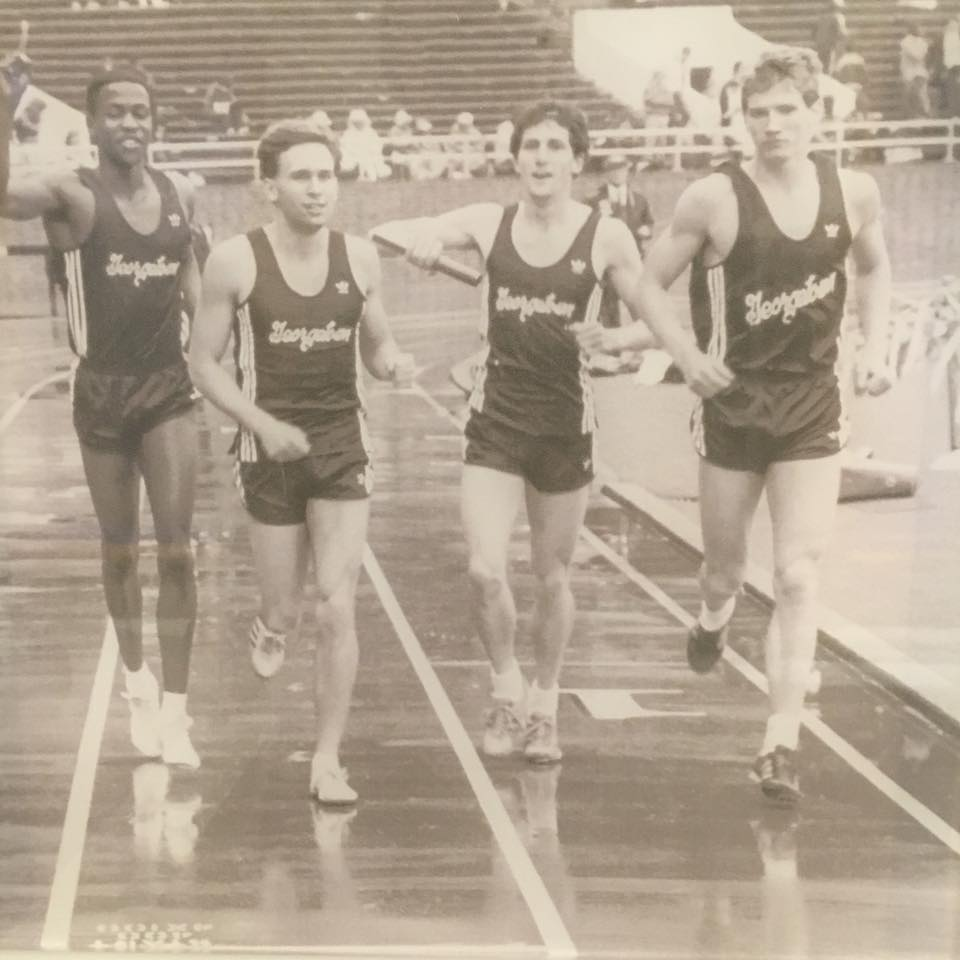
- Trautmann, second from left, at the 1987 Penn Relays

Personal information
- Full name: John Lawrence Trautmann
- Nationality: American
- Born: June 29, 1968 (age 58)

Sport
- Sport: Long-distance running
- Event: 5000 metres

John Lawrence Trautmann OLY (born June 29, 1968) is an American long-distance runner. He was the 1990 5000m NCAA Champion for Georgetown University and was on the 1987 Distance Medley Relay team at the Penn Relays that set a world record of 9:20.96. Trautmann won the 1992 US Olympic Trials 5000m. He competed at the 1992 Olympics, but did not finish due to injury. In 2015, he ran 4:12.33 to break the Masters M45 World Record in the mile under the guidance of his former college coach Frank Gagliano.

Trautmann is an assistant coach at NYU. He also coaches the Empire Elite Track Club with Tom Nohilly. Current athletes include Eric Holt and Helen Schlachtenhaufen.
