= Yobes Ondieki =

Athletics competitor from Kenya

Medal record

Men's athletics

Representing Kenya

World Championships
Gold medal – first place	1991 Tokyo	5000 m

Yobes Ondieki (born February 21, 1961, in Kisii, Nyanza) is a Kenyan former 5000 m runner, who won the World Championships' gold medal in Tokyo 1991. In the same year he set a temporary Kenyan 5000 m record of 13:01.82 in Zurich. He participated in the Olympic finals of 1988 and 1992 but did not win a medal. He was the first person to break 27:00 in the 10,000 m in 1993, with a then world record time of 26:58.38.

== Biography ==
Ondieki attended Iowa State University, where he captured four Big Eight conference titles, three of them in cross-country. Ondieki received All-America accolades six times at Iowa State. Although he never won an NCAA individual championship, he came close on several occasions, earning NCAA runner-up honours three times and third-place status three times. Except for the NCAA championship, he won every cross-country meet he competed in during the 1983 and 1984 seasons.

Ondieki was known for his demanding training sessions and his ability to run constantly at a high pace. However, he lacked a finishing kick, a weakness exploited by his opponents in the 1992 Olympic 5,000-metre final in Barcelona. In 1993, Ondieki became the first athlete to break the 27-minute barrier over 10,000 metres when he ran a world-record time of 26:58.38 at the Bislett Games in Oslo on July 10. His time broke the mark set by Richard Chelimo only five days earlier in Stockholm by over nine seconds.

From 1989 to 1993, Ondieki was ranked in the top five in the world in the 5,000 metres by Track & Field News, with his number-one ranking coming in 1991. In 1993, Track & Field News ranked him number one in the world in the 10,000 metres.

Ondieki married Lisa Martin, an Australian marathon runner. In 1990, they had a baby girl named Emma Ondieki. Today, Ondieki and Martin are divorced.

In September 1991, both he and Martin attended the AFL Grand Final and were presented to the crowd as a part of the pre-match entertainment. The televised footage of Ondieki laughing uncontrollably at the antics of Angry Anderson singing “Bound for Glory” in a blue Batmobile has been used in a more recent advertisement for Carlton Draught.

Records
Preceded by (Kenya) Richard Chelimo	Men's 10,000 m World Record Holder; July 10, 1993 – July 22, 1994	Succeeded by (Kenya) William Sigei
Sporting positions
Preceded by (Kenya) John Ngugi	Men's 5,000 m Best Year Performance; 1989	Succeeded by (Italy) Salvatore Antibo
Preceded by (Italy) Salvatore Antibo	Men's 5,000 m Best Year Performance; 1991	Succeeded by (Kenya) Moses Kiptanui
