= Carlos Monteiro (runner) =

Portuguese long-distance runner

Personal information
- Full name: Carlos Fernando Sousa Monteiro
- Nationality: Portuguese
- Born: 14 December 1965 (age 60) Avintes, Portugal

Sport
- Sport: Long-distance running
- Event: 5000 metres

Carlos Fernando Sousa Monteiro (born 14 December 1965) is a Portuguese long-distance runner. He competed in the men's 5000 metres at the 1992 Summer Olympics.
