= Andrew Sambu =

Tanzanian long-distance runner

Personal information
- Born: 5 October 1972 (age 53) Mbulu, Tanzania
- Height: 179 cm (5 ft 10 in)

Sport
- Sport: Long-distance running
- Event: 5000 metres
Medal record
Men's athletics
Representing Tanzania
African Championships
Silver medal – second place	1990 Cairo	5000 m
Silver medal – second place	1990 Cairo	10,000 m

Andrew Sambu (born 5 October 1972) is a Tanzanian long-distance runner. He competed in the men's 5000 metres at the 1992 Summer Olympics. He won the 2001 edition of the Prague Marathon in a time of 2:10:14.

== International competition record ==
Year	Competition	Venue	Position	Event	Notes
1990	African Championships	Cairo, Egypt	2nd	5000 m	13:33.90
1990	African Championships	Cairo, Egypt	2nd	10,000 m	28:31.50
1991	World Cross Country Championships	Antwerp, Belgium	1st	Junior men's race	23:59
1992	Summer Olympics	Barcelona, Spain	10th	5000 m	13:37.20
