= Risto Ulmala =

Finnish long-distance runner

Risto Ilmari Ulmala (born 7 May 1963 in Helsinki) is a Finnish former long-distance runner. Risto Ulmala's best achievement was 7th place in 5000 meters at World Championships 1991. In European Athletics Championships he was 6th in 5000 meters 1990 and 7th in 1994. After his track running career he competed in road races and marathons in the United States. He was 13th in New York City Marathon 1995 and participated in Olympic marathon 1996.

After his athletics career he lived in Colorado the United States and continued to run in miscellaneous races throughout the United States. In 2008 he returned to Finland and coached Jukka Keskisalo for one year. The coaching relationship between the two ended once Jukka Keskisalo ran in Berlin in 2009.

== Personal bests ==
- 1500m 3:41.66 (Jyväskylä 15.8.1991)
- Mile 4:03.34 (Kemi 12.7.1989)
- 3000m 7:44.5 (Stockholm 13.8.1991)
- 5000m 13:21.90 (Malmö 5.8.1991)
- 10000m 27.53.00 (Berlin 10.9.1991)
- Half marathon 1:03:12 (Imatra 1991)
- Marathon 2:13:58 (New York City Marathon 12.11.1995)

== Competition record ==
Year	Competition	Venue	Position	Event	Notes
Representing Finland
1990	European Championships	Split, Croatia	6th	5000 m	13:25.08
1991	World Championships	Tokyo, Japan	7th	5000 m	13:33.46
1992	Olympic Games	Barcelona, Spain	7th (h)	5000 m	13:52.52
1992	Olympic Games	Barcelona, Spain	—	10000 m	DNF
1994	European Championships	Helsinki, Finland	7th	5000 m	13:40.84
1994	European Championships	Helsinki, Finland	19th	10000 m	28:39.26
1996	Olympic Games	Atlanta, United States	—	Marathon	DNF
