= Reuben Reina =

American long-distance runner

Reuben Rory Reina (born November 16, 1967, in San Antonio, Texas) is an American retired track and field athlete, known for long-distance running. He represented the United States at the 1992 Summer Olympics, running the 5000 meters.

Reina was a high school star at John Jay High School. He won the 1985 Foot Locker Cross Country Championships in the record time of 14:36m, which remains the Balboa Park course record. He was also a seven time UIL Texas state champion, winning the mile and 2 mile events his last three years of high school, plus winning the state cross country title weeks before winning the Footlocker national championship.

He earned a scholarship to the University of Arkansas where he won back to back NCAA championships in the indoor 3000 meters. Arkansas won the indoor team title all four years Reina was with the team, in the midst of a 12 straight year title run. He also achieved a 3:57 mile.

After college he ran professionally, winning the USA Cross Country Championships twice, in 1994 and 1996.
