= Jonny Danielson =

Swedish long-distance runner

Personal information
- National team: Sweden
- Born: 4 September 1964 (age 61)

Sport
- Sport: Athletics 5000m

Bror Jonny Danielson (born 4 September 1964) is a retired Swedish 5000m runner who has also competed at the 1988 as well as in the 1992 Summer Olympics representing Sweden.

His son Emil Danielsson has also enjoyed success as a distance runner.

== See also ==
- Sweden at the 1988 Summer Olympics
- Sweden at the 1992 Summer Olympics
