= Marcel Versteeg =

Dutch long-distance runner

Personal information
- Born: 20 August 1965 (age 60) Arnhem, the Netherlands
- Height: 1.93 m (6 ft 4 in)
- Weight: 75 kg (165 lb)

Sport
- Sport: Long-distance running
- Club: Amsterdams Atletiek Combinatie (AAC)

Achievements and titles
- Olympic finals: 1992

Marcel Jean Versteeg (born 20 August 1965) is a retired Dutch long-distance runner. He competed at the 1992 Summer Olympics in the 5000 m and finished in 15th place. He won four national titles in this event, in 1990, 1991, 1994 and 1998, as well as one title in 10,000 m in 2001.
