= Dionísio Castro =

Portuguese long-distance runner (born 1963)

Dionísio Silva Castro (born 22 November 1963 in Fermentões-Guimarães) is a former long-distance runner from Portugal, best known for setting the world record in the 20,000 metres on 31 March 1990, when he clocked 57:18.4 in La Flèche. Castro continued for another 943 metres in an attempt to break Jos Hermens' world record for the one-hour run as well, but missed out by one metre. He competed for the Portuguese club Sporting Clube de Portugal.

His twin brother Domingos was also a world class athlete in the long distance events. The two of them represented their native country at the 1988 (Seoul, South Korea) and 1992 Summer Olympics (Barcelona, Spain).

== Achievements ==
- All results regarding marathon, unless stated otherwise

Year	Competition	Venue	Position	Event	Notes
Representing Portugal
1986	European Championships	Stuttgart, West Germany	11th	10,000m	28:17.46
1990	European Championships	Split, Yugoslavia	4th	5000m	13:23.99
1992	Olympic Games	Barcelona, Spain	—	Marathon	DNF

Records
Preceded by (Netherlands) Jos Hermens	Men's 20,000 m world record holder 31 March 1990 – 30 March 1991	Succeeded by (Mexico) Arturo Barrios
