= Domingos Castro =

Portuguese long-distance runner (born 1963)

Personal information
- Full name: Domingos Silva Castro
- Nationality: Portuguese
- Born: 22 November 1963 (age 62) Guimarães, Portugal
Medal record
Men's athletics
Representing Portugal
World Championships
Silver medal – second place	1987 Rome	5000 m
World Marathon Majors
Gold medal – first place	1995 Paris	Marathon
Gold medal – first place	1997 Rotterdam	Marathon
Silver medal – second place	1999 New York	Marathon

Domingos Silva Castro (born 22 November 1963) is a Portuguese former long-distance runner. He was one of the leading athletes in the longer events during the late 1980s and early 1990s. He won the silver medal in the 5,000 metres at the 1987 World Championships. As a marathoner, he won the 1995 edition of the Paris Marathon, clocking 2:10:06, and the Rotterdam Marathon of 1997, in his personal best of 2:07:51. He won the Cross Internacional de Venta de Baños four times in his career – more than any other athlete. He also came in 2nd place overall in the 1999 New York City Marathon.

At the 1988 Olympic Games, he ran the 5,000m and, as the race unfolded, Kenyan athlete John Ngugi made a substantial leading break. Castro made a brave attempt to chase him and for several laps held on to the silver medal position. In the last lap however, Castro's form started to fade, and in the last 30 metres, West German Dieter Baumann and East German Hansjörg Kunze sprinted past him, taking silver and bronze respectively, robbing a distraught Castro of a reward for his brave run.

His twin brother Dionísio was also a world class athlete in the long-distance events. The two of them represented their native country at the 1988 (Seoul, South Korea) and 1992 Summer Olympics (Barcelona, Spain). Domingos also competed in the 1996 (Atlanta, United States) and 2000 Summer Olympics (Sydney, Australia).

== Achievements ==
- All results regarding marathon, unless stated otherwise

Year	Competition	Venue	Position	Event	Notes
Representing Portugal
1994	European Championships	Helsinki, Finland	9th	5000m	13:42.09
1994	European Championships	Helsinki, Finland	17th	10,000m	28:33.89
1994	New York City Marathon	New York City, United States	5th	Marathon	2:12:49
1995	Paris Marathon	Paris, France	1st	Marathon	2:10:06
1996	London Marathon	London, United Kingdom	6th	Marathon	2:11:12
1996	Olympic Games	Atlanta, United States	25th	Marathon	2:18:03
1997	Rotterdam Marathon	Rotterdam, Netherlands	1st	Marathon	2:07:51
1997	New York City Marathon	New York City, United States	6th	Marathon	2:10:23
1999	London Marathon	London, United Kingdom	8th	Marathon	2:10:24
1999	New York City Marathon	New York City, United States	2nd	Marathon	2:09:20
2000	Olympic Games	Sydney, Australia	18th	Marathon	2:16:52
2002	Berlin Marathon	Berlin, Germany	18th	Marathon	2:13:23
