= Brahim Boutayeb =

Moroccan long-distance runner

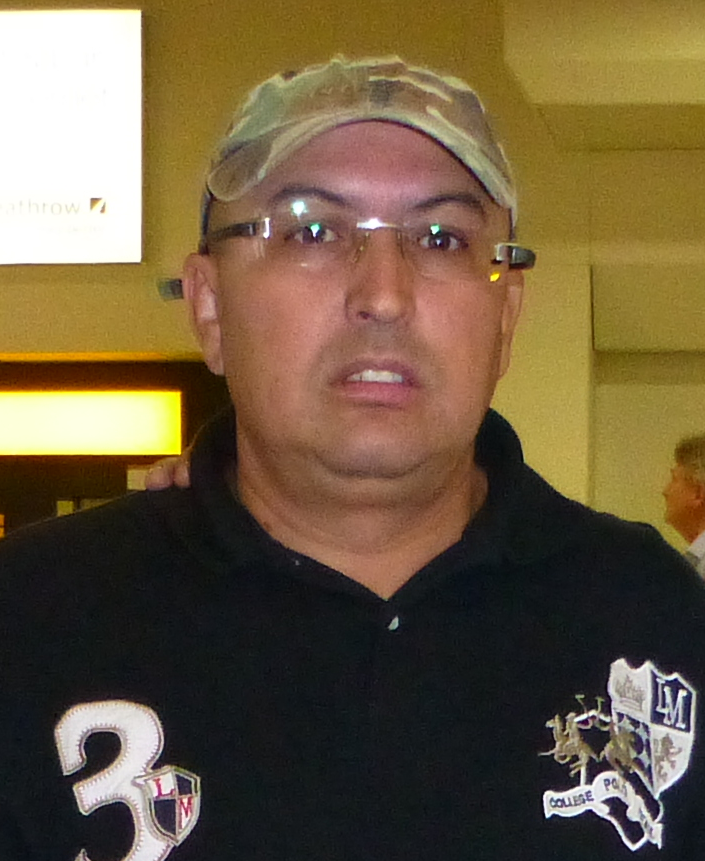
- Boutayeb in 2012

Medal record

Men's athletics

Representing Morocco

Olympic Games
Gold medal – first place	1988 Seoul	10000 m

World Championships
Bronze medal – third place	1991 Tokyo	5000 m

African Championships
Gold medal – first place	1988 Annaba	5000 m
Gold medal – first place	1988 Annaba	10,000 m

Mediterranean Games
Gold medal – first place	1991 Athens	5000 m

Moulay Brahim Boutayeb (Arabic: مولاي ابراهيم بوطيب; born 15 August 1967) is a retired Moroccan track and field athlete. He was the winner of the 10,000 m race at the 1988 Summer Olympics.

== Career ==
Boutayeb was born in Khemisset, Morocco. Although he had been considered more a 5000 m runner before 1988, he was quite unknown until the Seoul Olympics.

The 10,000 m final at Seoul was started at a very fast pace, pushed along mostly by Kenyans, Kipkemboi Kimeli, and Moses Tanui. A small lead group reached the halfway mark at world record pace, at which point Boutayeb moved to lead. He continued the race at world record pace, but deliberately slowed after the bell to finish in a world's fourth fastest time of 27:21.46.

After the Olympic Games, Boutayeb decided to concentrate again on shorter distances, running his personal bests in distances from 1500 m to 5000 m over the next couple of seasons. He placed second in the season rankings for the 1988 IAAF Grand Prix Final. He won a bronze medal in 5000 m at the 1991 World Championships held in Tokyo. At the Barcelona Olympic Games, Boutayeb came fourth in 5000 m, only 0.75 seconds behind the winner Dieter Baumann from Germany.

After being eliminated in his heat of the 5000 m at the 1993 World Championships in Stuttgart, Brahim Boutayeb retired from competitive athletics and preferred to concentrate on his new sporting interest as a rally driver.
