= 5000 metres =

Long-distance track running event

Athletics 5000 metres
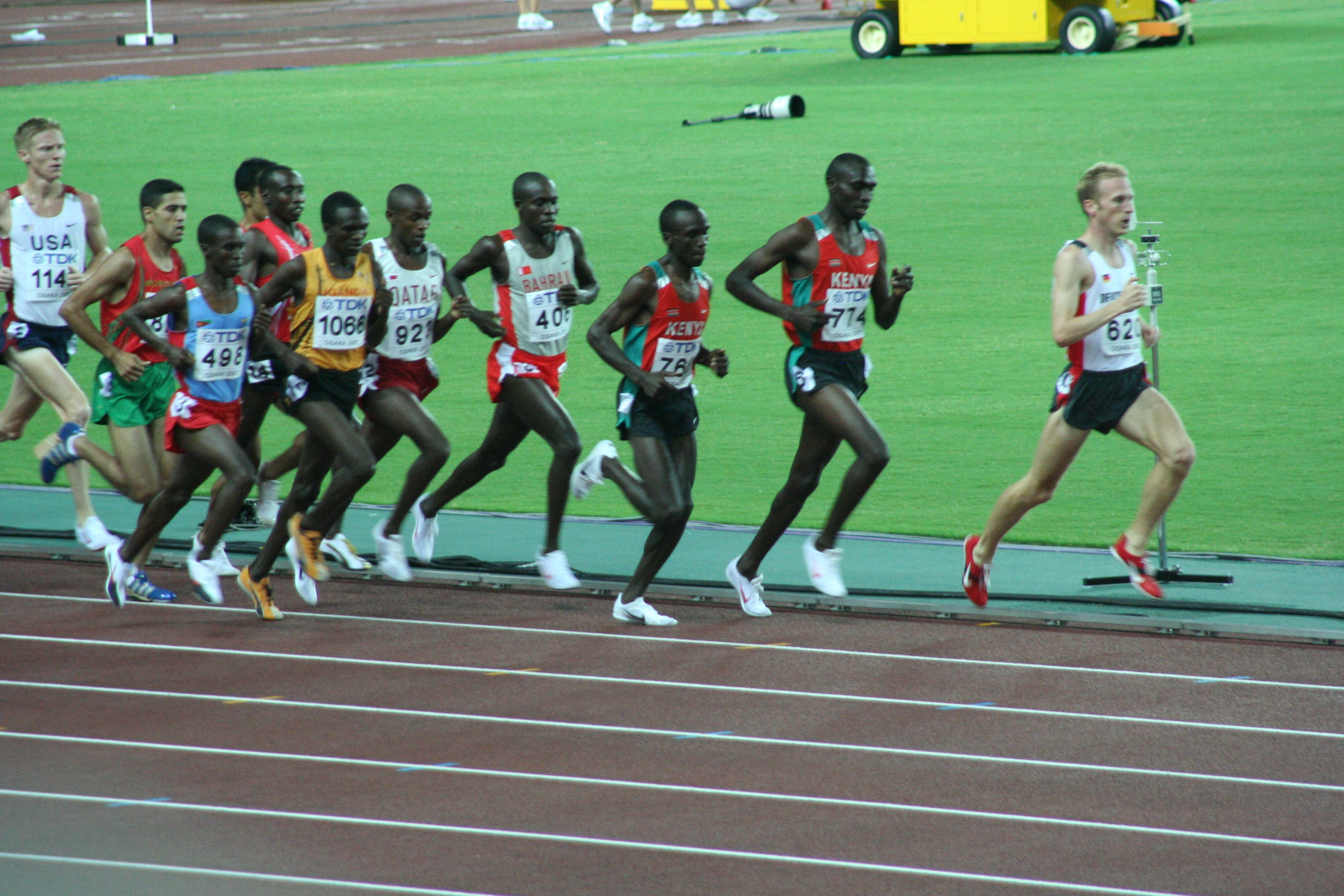
- Runners in the 5000 metres at IAAF World Championships in Osaka 2007

World records
- Men: Joshua Cheptegei (UGA) 12:35.36 (2020)
- Women: Beatrice Chebet (KEN) 13:58.06 (2025)

Short track world records
- Men: Grant Fisher (USA) 12:44.09 (2025)
- Women: Genzebe Dibaba (ETH) 14:18.86 (2015)

Olympic records
- Men: Kenenisa Bekele (ETH) 12:57.82 (2008)
- Women: Vivian Cheruiyot (KEN) 14:26.17 (2016)

World Championship records
- Men: Eliud Kipchoge (KEN) 12:52.79 (2003)
- Women: Hellen Obiri (KEN) 14:26.72 (2019)

World junior (U20) records
- Men: Selemon Barega (ETH) 12:43.02 (2018)
- Women: Medina Eisa (ETH) 14:16.54 (2023)

The 5000 metres or 5000-metre run is a common long-distance running event in track and field. It is one of the track events in the Olympic Games and the World Championships in Athletics, run over 12 1/2 laps of a standard 400 m track, or 25 laps on an indoor 200 m track. The same distance in road running is called a 5K run; referring to the distance in metres rather than kilometres serves to disambiguate the two events. The 5000 m has been present on the Olympic programme since 1912 for men and since 1996 for women. Prior to 1996, women had competed in an Olympic 3000 metres race since 1984. The 5000 m has been held at each of the World Championships in Athletics in men's competition and since 1995 in women's. It is approximately equivalent to 3 miles 188 yards or 16,404 feet 2 inches.

The event is almost the same length as the dolichos race held at the Ancient Olympic Games, introduced in 720 BCE. World Athletics keeps official records for both outdoor and indoor 5000-metre track events.

== 3 miles ==
The 5000 metres is the (slightly longer) approximate metric equivalent of the 3-mile (4,828.0 m) run, an event common in countries which used the imperial measurement system. The 3-mile event featured in the Commonwealth Games through 1966, and was a championship in the United States in non-Olympic years from 1953 to 1973. It required 12 laps around a 1/4-mile (402 m; 440 yd; 1,320 ft) track.

== Area records ==
- Updated 5 September 2026.

Area	Men			Women		
Area	Time	Season	Athlete	Time	Season	Athlete
World	12:35.36	2020	Joshua Cheptegei (UGA)	13:58.06	2025	Beatrice Chebet (KEN)
Area records
Africa (records)	12:35.36	2020	Joshua Cheptegei (UGA)	13:58.06	2025	Beatrice Chebet (KEN)
Asia (records)	12:45.70	2026	Birhanu Balew (BHR)	14:28.09	1997	Jiang Bo (CHN)
Europe (records)	12:44.27	2025	Andreas Almgren (SWE)	14:13.42	2023	Sifan Hassan (NED)
North, Central America and Caribbean (records)	12:44.09 i (Note: Indoor record also ratified as outdoor record.)	2025	Grant Fisher (USA)	14:19.45	2023	Alicia Monson (USA)
Oceania (records)	12:50.82	2026	Ky Robinson (AUS)	14:31.45	2025	Rose Davies (AUS)
South America (records)	12:59.26	2025	Santiago Catrofe (URU)	14:36.59	2024	Joselyn Brea (VEN)

== All-time top 25 ==
Tables show data for two definitions of "Top 25" - the top 25 5000 m times and the top 25 athletes:
- denotes top performance for athletes in the top 25 5000 m times
- denotes lesser performances, still in the top 25 5000 m times, by repeat athletes
- denotes top performance (only) for other top 25 athletes who fall outside the top 25 5000 m times

=== Men (outdoor) ===
- Updated September 2026.

Ath.#	Perf.#	Time	Athlete	Nation	Date	Place	Ref.
1	1	12:35.36	Joshua Cheptegei	Uganda	14 August 2020	Monaco	
2	2	12:36.73	Hagos Gebrhiwet	Ethiopia	30 May 2024	Oslo	
3	3	12:37.35	Kenenisa Bekele	Ethiopia	31 May 2004	Hengelo	
4	4	12:38.95	Yomif Kejelcha	Ethiopia	30 May 2024	Oslo	
5	5	12:39.36	Haile Gebrselassie	Ethiopia	13 June 1998	Helsinki	
6	6	12:39.74	Daniel Komen	Kenya	22 August 1997	Brussels	
	7	12:40.18	K. Bekele #2		1 July 2005	Saint-Denis	
7	8	12:40.45	Berihu Aregawi	Ethiopia	30 June 2023	Lausanne	
8	9	12:40.96	Jacob Kiplimo	Uganda	30 May 2024	Oslo	
	10	12:41.61	Cheptegei #2		30 June 2023	Lausanne	
	11	12:41.73	Kejelcha #2		15 June 2023	Oslo	
	11	12:41.73	Kiplimo #2		15 June 2023	Oslo	
	13	12:41.86	Gebrselassie #2		13 August 1997	Zürich	
	14	12:42.18	Gebrhiwet #2		21 July 2023	Monaco	
	15	12:42.58	Aregawi #2		21 July 2023	Monaco	
9	16	12:42.70	Telahun Haile Bekele	Ethiopia	21 July 2023	Monaco	
10	17	12:43.02	Selemon Barega	Ethiopia	31 August 2018	Brussels	
	18	12:43.66	Aregawi #3		13 September 2024	Brussels	
	19	12:44.25	Gebrhiwet #3		13 September 2024	Brussels	
11	20	12:44.27	Andreas Almgren	Sweden	15 June 2025	Stockholm	
	21	12:44.39	Gebrselassie #3		16 August 1995	Zürich	
	22	12:44.90	Komen #2		13 August 1997	Zürich	
12	23	12:45.01	Mohamed Katir	Spain	21 July 2023	Monaco	
	24	12:45.09	Komen #3		14 August 1996	Zürich	
13	25	12:45.27	Nico Young	United States	12 June 2025	Oslo	
14		12:45.70	Birhanu Balew	Bahrain	5 September 2026	Brussels	
15		12:45.71	Jacob Krop	Kenya	2 September 2022	Brussels	
16		12:45.93	Biniam Mehary	Ethiopia	12 June 2025	Oslo	
17		12:46.33	Nicholas Kimeli	Kenya	9 June 2022	Rome	
18		12:46.41	Kuma Girma	Ethiopia	12 June 2025	Oslo	
19		12:46.53	Eliud Kipchoge	Kenya	2 July 2004	Rome	
20		12:46.59	George Mills	Great Britain	12 June 2025	Oslo	
21		12:46.73	Egide Ntakarutimana	Burundi	5 September 2026	Brussels	
22		12:46.81	Dejen Gebremeskel	Ethiopia	6 July 2012	Saint-Denis	
23		12:46.96	Grant Fisher	United States	2 September 2022	Brussels	
24		12:47.04	Sileshi Sihine	Ethiopia	2 July 2004	Rome	
25		12:47.20	Mohammed Ahmed	Canada	10 July 2020	Portland	

=== Women (outdoor) ===
- Updated June 2026.

Ath.#	Perf.#	Time	Athlete	Nation	Date	Place	Ref.
1	1	13:58.06	Beatrice Chebet	Kenya	5 July 2025	Eugene	
2	2	14:00.21	Gudaf Tsegay	Ethiopia	17 September 2023	Eugene	
3	3	14:01.29	Agnes Jebet Ngetich	Kenya	5 July 2025	Eugene	
	4	14:03.69	Chebet #2		6 June 2025	Rome	
	5	14:04.41	Tsegay #2		5 July 2025	Eugene	
4	6	14:05.20	Faith Kipyegon	Kenya	9 June 2023	Paris	
	7	14:05.92	Chebet #3		17 September 2023	Eugene	
5	8	14:06.62	Letesenbet Gidey	Ethiopia	7 October 2020	Valencia	
	9	14:07.94	Gidey #2		9 June 2023	Paris	
	10	14:08.79	Gidey #3		3 September 2023	Berlin	
	11	14:09.52	Chebet #4		5 September 2024	Zurich	
	12	14:09.82	Chebet #5		14 September 2024	Brussels	
6	13	14:11.15	Tirunesh Dibaba	Ethiopia	6 June 2008	Oslo	
	14	14:12.29	Tsegay #3		23 July 2023	London	
7	15	14:12.59	Almaz Ayana	Ethiopia	2 June 2016	Rome	
8	16	14:12.88	Meseret Defar	Ethiopia	22 July 2008	Stockholm	
	17	14:12.92	Chebet #6		23 July 2023	London	
9	18	14:12.98	Ejgayehu Taye	Ethiopia	27 May 2022	Eugene	
	19	14:13.31	Taye #2		9 June 2023	Paris	
	20	14:13.32	Tsegay #4		8 June 2021	Hengelo	
10	21	14:13.42	Sifan Hassan	Netherlands	23 July 2023	London	
	22	14:14.09	Taye #3		8 June 2021	Hengelo	
	23	14:14.32	Ayana #2		17 May 2015	Shanghai	
11	24	14:15.24	Senbere Teferi	Ethiopia	8 June 2021	Hengelo	
12	25	14:15.41	Genzebe Dibaba	Ethiopia	4 July 2015	Saint-Denis	
13		14:16.54	Medina Eisa	Ethiopia	23 July 2023	London	
14		14:18.37	Hellen Obiri	Kenya	8 June 2017	Rome	
15		14:18.41	Likina Amebaw	Ethiopia	4 June 2026	Rome	
16		14:18.54	Aleshign Baweke	Ethiopia	4 June 2026	Rome	
17		14:18.76	Tsigie Gebreselama	Ethiopia	25 May 2024	Eugene	
18		14:18.94	Freweyni Hailu	Ethiopia	4 June 2026	Rome	
19		14:19.45	Alicia Monson	United States	23 July 2023	London	
20		14:20.68	Agnes Tirop	Kenya	21 July 2019	London	
21		14:20.87	Vivian Cheruiyot	Kenya	29 July 2011	Stockholm	
22		14:22.37	Senayet Getachew	Ethiopia	4 June 2026	Rome	
23		14:22.56	Hirut Meshesha	Ethiopia	4 June 2026	Rome	
24		14:22.76	Aynadis Mebratu	Ethiopia	25 May 2024	Eugene	
25		14:23.05	Lilian Kasait Rengeruk	Kenya	9 June 2023	Paris	

=== Men (indoor) ===
- Updated 22 February 2026.

Ath.#	Perf.#	Time	Athlete	Nation	Date	Place	Ref.
1	1	12:44.09	Grant Fisher	United States	14 February 2025	Boston	
2	2	12:49.60	Kenenisa Bekele	Ethiopia	20 February 2004	Birmingham	
3	3	12:50.38	Haile Gebrselassie	Ethiopia	14 February 1999	Birmingham	
4	4	12:51.48	Daniel Komen	Kenya	19 February 1998	Stockholm	
5	5	12:51.56	Nico Young	United States	2 March 2025	Boston	
6	6	12:51.61	William Kincaid	United States	27 January 2023	Boston	
	7	12:51.84	Fisher #2		16 February 2024	Boston	
7	8	12:53.29	Isiah Koech	Kenya	11 February 2011	Düsseldorf	
	9	12:53.73	Fisher #3		12 February 2022	Boston	
8	10	12:54.92	Jimmy Gressier	France	14 February 2025	Boston	
9	11	12:54.99	Joe Klecker	United States	27 January 2023	Boston	
10	12	12:55.02	Adriaan Wildschutt	South Africa	2 March 2025	Boston	
11	13	12:55.72	Eliud Kipchoge	Kenya	11 February 2011	Düsseldorf	
	14	12:56.76	Wildschutt #2		26 January 2024	Boston	
12	15	12:56.87	Mohammed Ahmed	Canada	12 February 2022	Boston	
13	16	12:57.08	Marc Scott	Great Britain	12 February 2022	Boston	
	17	12:57.14	Young #2		26 January 2024	Boston	
14	18	12:57.52	Edwin Kurgat	Kenya	26 January 2024	Boston	
15	19	12:57.82	Cole Hocker	United States	21 February 2025	Boston	
16	20	12:57.97	Cooper Teare	United States	21 February 2025	Boston	
17	21	12:58.67	Thomas Longosiwa	Kenya	10 February 2012	Düsseldorf	
18	22	12:58.68	George Mills	Great Britain	26 January 2024	Boston	
19	23	12:58.73	Sam Atkin	Great Britain	26 January 2024	Boston	
	24	12:59.04	Gebrselassie #2		20 February 1997	Stockholm	
20	25	12:59.09	Parker Wolfe	United States	22 February 2026	Boston	
21		12:59.43	Jack Rayner	Australia	21 February 2025	Boston	
22		12:59.77	Gulveer Singh	India	21 February 2025	Boston	
23		12:59.89	Graham Blanks	United States	7 December 2024	Boston	
24		13:00.48	Emmanuel Bor	United States	12 February 2022	Boston	
25		13:01.26	Galen Rupp	United States	16 January 2014	Boston	

=== Women (indoor) ===
- Updated February 2026.

Ath.#	Perf.#	Time	Athlete	Nation	Date	Place	Ref.
1	1	14:18.86	Genzebe Dibaba	Ethiopia	19 February 2015	Stockholm	
2	2	14:24.37	Meseret Defar	Ethiopia	18 February 2009	Stockholm	
	3	14:24.79	Defar #2		10 February 2010	Stockholm	
3	4	14:27.42	Tirunesh Dibaba	Ethiopia	27 January 2007	Boston	
4	5	14:30.79	Konstanze Klosterhalfen	Germany	27 February 2020	Boston	
5	6	14:31.38	Gabriela DeBues-Stafford	Canada	11 February 2022	Boston	
	7	14:32.93	T. Dibaba #2		29 January 2005	Boston	
6	8	14:33.17	Elise Cranny	United States	11 February 2022	Boston	
	9	14:35.46	T. Dibaba #3		28 January 2006	Boston	
7	10	14:39.29	Berhane Adere	Ethiopia	31 January 2004	Stuttgart	
8	11	14:39.89	Kimberley Smith	New Zealand	27 February 2009	New York City	
9	12	14:42.94	Senayet Getachew	Ethiopia	27 January 2024	Boston	
10	13	14:43.25	Fantaye Belayneh	Ethiopia	27 January 2024	Boston	
	14	14:44.53	T. Dibaba #4		6 February 2010	Boston	
11	15	14:44.79	Jane Hedengren	United States	6 December 2025	Boston	
12	16	14:44.94	Aynadis Mebratu	Ethiopia	27 January 2024	Boston	
13	17	14:46.37	Marta Garcia	Spain	27 January 2024	Boston	
14	18	14:46.51	Josette Andrews	United States	27 January 2024	Boston	
15	19	14:46.80	Sentayehu Ejigu	Ethiopia	10 February 2010	Stockholm	
16	20	14:47.35	Gabriela Szabo	Romania	13 February 1999	Dortmund	
	21	14:47.62	Ejigu #2		7 February 2009	Boston	
17	22	14:47.62	Shalane Flanagan	United States	7 February 2009	Boston	
	23	14:48.21	Adere #2		5 February 2003	Dortmund	
18	24	14:48.41	Whittni Morgan	United States	31 January 2025	Boston	
19	25	14:48.51	Vanessa Fraser	United States	27 February 2020	Boston	
20		14:48.75	Courtney Frerichs	United States	11 February 2022	Boston	
21		14:49.12	Laura Muir	Great Britain	4 January 2017	Glasgow	
22		14:49.36	Gete Wami	Ethiopia	11 February 2001	Dortmund	
23		14:49.78	Courtney Wayment	United States	27 January 2024	Boston	
24		14:50.89	Ella Donaghu	United States	31 January 2025	Boston	
25		14:51.21	Doris Lemngole	Kenya	14 February 2026	Boston	

== Olympic medalists ==
=== Men ===
Two men have won the Olympic 5000 metres on two occasions, both times back-to-back. Lasse Virén of Finland was the first to achieve the feat, winning the title in 1972 in Munich, before retaining the title in 1976 in Montreal. Mo Farah of Great Britain matched the achievement, winning the title in 2012 in London, and retaining it four years later in Rio de Janeiro. Both men achieved 5000/10000 m doubles on each occasion.

Paavo Nurmi is the only male runner to have won three Olympic medals at the distance; one gold and two silvers between 1920 and 1928.

Games	Gold	Silver	Bronze
1912 Stockholm	Hannes Kolehmainen; Finland	Jean Bouin; France	George Hutson; Great Britain
1920 Antwerp	Joseph Guillemot; France	Paavo Nurmi; Finland	Eric Backman; Sweden
1924 Paris	Paavo Nurmi; Finland	Ville Ritola; Finland	Edvin Wide; Sweden
1928 Amsterdam	Ville Ritola; Finland	Paavo Nurmi; Finland	Edvin Wide; Sweden
1932 Los Angeles	Lauri Lehtinen; Finland	Ralph Hill; United States	Lauri Virtanen; Finland
1936 Berlin	Gunnar Höckert; Finland	Lauri Lehtinen; Finland	Henry Jonsson; Sweden
1948 London	Gaston Reiff; Belgium	Emil Zátopek; Czechoslovakia	Willem Slijkhuis; Netherlands
1952 Helsinki	Emil Zátopek; Czechoslovakia	Alain Mimoun; France	Herbert Schade; Germany
1956 Melbourne	Vladimir Kuts; Soviet Union	Gordon Pirie; Great Britain	Derek Ibbotson; Great Britain
1960 Rome	Murray Halberg; New Zealand	Hans Grodotzki; United Team of Germany	Kazimierz Zimny; Poland
1964 Tokyo	Bob Schul; United States	Harald Norpoth; United Team of Germany	Bill Dellinger; United States
1968 Mexico City	Mohammed Gammoudi; Tunisia	Kipchoge Keino; Kenya	Naftali Temu; Kenya
1972 Munich	Lasse Virén; Finland	Mohammed Gammoudi; Tunisia	Ian Stewart; Great Britain
1976 Montreal	Lasse Virén; Finland	Dick Quax; New Zealand	Klaus-Peter Hildenbrand; West Germany
1980 Moscow	Miruts Yifter; Ethiopia	Suleiman Nyambui; Tanzania	Kaarlo Maaninka; Finland
1984 Los Angeles	Saïd Aouita; Morocco	Markus Ryffel; Switzerland	António Leitão; Portugal
1988 Seoul	John Ngugi; Kenya	Dieter Baumann; West Germany	Hansjörg Kunze; East Germany
1992 Barcelona	Dieter Baumann; Germany	Paul Bitok; Kenya	Fita Bayisa; Ethiopia
1996 Atlanta	Vénuste Niyongabo; Burundi	Paul Bitok; Kenya	Khalid Boulami; Morocco
2000 Sydney	Million Wolde; Ethiopia	Ali Saïdi-Sief; Algeria	Brahim Lahlafi; Morocco
2004 Athens	Hicham El Guerrouj; Morocco	Kenenisa Bekele; Ethiopia	Eliud Kipchoge; Kenya
2008 Beijing	Kenenisa Bekele; Ethiopia	Eliud Kipchoge; Kenya	Edwin Soi; Kenya
2012 London	Mo Farah; Great Britain	Dejen Gebremeskel; Ethiopia	Thomas Longosiwa; Kenya
2016 Rio de Janeiro	Mo Farah; Great Britain	Paul Chelimo; United States	Hagos Gebrhiwet; Ethiopia
2020 Tokyo	Joshua Cheptegei; Uganda	Mohammed Ahmed; Canada	Paul Chelimo; United States
2024 Paris	Jakob Ingebrigtsen; Norway	Ronald Kwemoi; Kenya	Grant Fisher; United States
2028 Los Angeles			

=== Women ===
Only one woman has won the Olympic 5000 metres title twice, Ethiopian Meseret Defar winning in Athens in 2004, taking silver behind compatriot Tirunesh Dibaba in 2008, before regaining the title in London in 2012. Defar and Dibaba are the only athletes with three Olympic medals at the distance, with both reaching the podium in 2004, 2008 and 2012.

Games	Gold	Silver	Bronze
1996 Atlanta	Wang Junxia; China	Pauline Konga; Kenya	Roberta Brunet; Italy
2000 Sydney	Gabriela Szabo; Romania	Sonia O'Sullivan; Ireland	Gete Wami; Ethiopia
2004 Athens	Meseret Defar; Ethiopia	Isabella Ochichi; Kenya	Tirunesh Dibaba; Ethiopia
2008 Beijing	Tirunesh Dibaba; Ethiopia	Meseret Defar; Ethiopia	Sylvia Kibet; Kenya
2012 London	Meseret Defar; Ethiopia	Vivian Cheruiyot; Kenya	Tirunesh Dibaba; Ethiopia
2016 Rio de Janeiro	Vivian Cheruiyot; Kenya	Hellen Obiri; Kenya	Almaz Ayana; Ethiopia
2020 Tokyo	Sifan Hassan; Netherlands	Hellen Obiri; Kenya	Gudaf Tsegay; Ethiopia
2024 Paris	Beatrice Chebet; Kenya	Faith Kipyegon; Kenya	Sifan Hassan; Netherlands
2028 Los Angeles			

== World Championships medalists ==
=== Men ===
In the World Championships, Great Britain's Mo Farah stands alone, the most successful and most decorated athlete in the event with three gold medals (2011, 2013 and 2015) and four medals in total (including silver in 2017) between 2011 and 2017. Kenya's Ismael Kirui was the first athlete to win the title twice in 1993 and 1995, and Ethiopia's Muktar Edris the third between 2017 and 2019.

Championships	Gold	Silver	Bronze
1983 Helsinki	Eamonn Coghlan (IRL)	Werner Schildhauer (GDR)	Martti Vainio (FIN)
1987 Rome	Saïd Aouita (MAR)	Domingos Castro (POR)	Jack Buckner (GBR)
1991 Tokyo	Yobes Ondieki (KEN)	Fita Bayisa (ETH)	Brahim Boutayeb (MAR)
1993 Stuttgart	Ismael Kirui (KEN)	Haile Gebrselassie (ETH)	Fita Bayisa (ETH)
1995 Gothenburg	Ismael Kirui (KEN)	Khalid Boulami (MAR)	Shem Kororia (KEN)
1997 Athens	Daniel Komen (KEN)	Khalid Boulami (MAR)	Tom Nyariki (KEN)
1999 Seville	Salah Hissou (MAR)	Benjamin Limo (KEN)	Mohammed Mourhit (BEL)
2001 Edmonton	Richard Limo (KEN)	Million Wolde (ETH)	John Kibowen (KEN)
2003 Saint-Denis	Eliud Kipchoge (KEN)	Hicham El Guerrouj (MAR)	Kenenisa Bekele (ETH)
2005 Helsinki	Benjamin Limo (KEN)	Sileshi Sihine (ETH)	Craig Mottram (AUS)
2007 Osaka	Bernard Lagat (USA)	Eliud Kipchoge (KEN)	Moses Kipsiro (UGA)
2009 Berlin	Kenenisa Bekele (ETH)	Bernard Lagat (USA)	James Kwalia (QAT)
2011 Daegu	Mo Farah (GBR)	Bernard Lagat (USA)	Dejen Gebremeskel (ETH)
2013 Moscow	Mo Farah (GBR)	Hagos Gebrhiwet (ETH)	Isiah Koech (KEN)
2015 Beijing	Mo Farah (GBR)	Caleb Ndiku (KEN)	Hagos Gebrhiwet (ETH)
2017 London	Muktar Edris (ETH)	Mo Farah (GBR)	Paul Chelimo (USA)
2019 Doha	Muktar Edris (ETH)	Selemon Barega (ETH)	Mohammed Ahmed (CAN)
2022 Eugene	Jakob Ingebrigtsen (NOR)	Jacob Krop (KEN)	Oscar Chelimo (UGA)
2023 Budapest	Jakob Ingebrigtsen (NOR)	Mohamed Katir (ESP)	Jacob Krop (KEN)
2025 Tokyo	Cole Hocker (USA)	Isaac Kimeli (BEL)	Jimmy Gressier (FRA)

=== Women ===
Romania's Gabriela Szabo won the title twice between 1995 and 1997. Since then four African runners - two Kenyan, two Ethiopian - have repeated the feat; Tirunesh Dibaba and Meseret Defar of Ethiopia and Vivian Cheruiyot and Hellen Obiri of Kenya. Meseret Defar's five medals - 2 gold, a silver and two bronze won between 2005 and 2013 - are the most won in the event by any athlete.

Championships	Gold	Silver	Bronze
1995 Gothenburg	Sonia O'Sullivan (IRL)	Fernanda Ribeiro (POR)	Zahra Ouaziz (MAR)
1997 Athens	Gabriela Szabo (ROU)	Roberta Brunet (ITA)	Fernanda Ribeiro (POR)
1999 Seville	Gabriela Szabo (ROU)	Zahra Ouaziz (MAR)	Ayelech Worku (ETH)
2001 Edmonton	Olga Yegorova (RUS)	Marta Dominguez (ESP)	Ayelech Worku (ETH)
2003 Saint-Denis	Tirunesh Dibaba (ETH)	Marta Dominguez (ESP)	Edith Masai (KEN)
2005 Helsinki	Tirunesh Dibaba (ETH)	Meseret Defar (ETH)	Ejegayehu Dibaba (ETH)
2007 Osaka	Meseret Defar (ETH)	Vivian Cheruiyot (KEN)	Priscah Jepleting Cherono (KEN)
2009 Berlin	Vivian Cheruiyot (KEN)	Sylvia Jebiwott Kibet (KEN)	Meseret Defar (ETH)
2011 Daegu	Vivian Cheruiyot (KEN)	Sylvia Jebiwott Kibet (KEN)	Meseret Defar (ETH)
2013 Moscow	Meseret Defar (ETH)	Mercy Cherono (KEN)	Almaz Ayana (ETH)
2015 Beijing	Almaz Ayana (ETH)	Senbere Teferi (ETH)	Genzebe Dibaba (ETH)
2017 London	Hellen Obiri (KEN)	Almaz Ayana (ETH)	Sifan Hassan (NED)
2019 Doha	Hellen Obiri (KEN)	Margaret Kipkemboi (KEN)	Konstanze Klosterhalfen (GER)
2022 Eugene	Gudaf Tsegay (ETH)	Beatrice Chebet (KEN)	Dawit Seyaum (ETH)
2023 Budapest	Faith Kipyegon (KEN)	Sifan Hassan (NED)	Beatrice Chebet (KEN)
2025 Tokyo	Beatrice Chebet (KEN)	Faith Kipyegon (KEN)	Nadia Battocletti (ITA)

== World leading times ==
=== Men ===
Year	Time	Athlete	Place
1960	13:38.1 h	Pyotr Bolotnikov (URS)	Kyiv
1961	13:38.2 h	Murray Halberg (NZL)	Stockholm
1962	13:38.4 h	Murray Halberg (NZL)	Auckland
1963	13:38.6 h	Pyotr Bolotnikov (URS)	Zürich
1964	13:38.0 h	Bob Schul (USA)	Compton
1965	13:24.2 h	Kipchoge Keino (KEN)	Auckland
1966	13:16.6 h	Ron Clarke (AUS)	Stockholm
1967	13:18.8 h	Ron Clarke (AUS)	Stockholm
1968	13:27.66	Ron Clarke (AUS)	London
1969	13:28.96	Dick Taylor (GBR)	London
1970	13:22.8 h	Ian Stewart (GBR)	Edinburgh
1971	13:22.2 h	Dave Bedford (GBR)	Edinburgh
1972	13:13.0 h	Emiel Puttemans (BEL)	Brussels
1973	13:14.51	Emiel Puttemans (BEL)	Stockholm
1974	13:14.4 h	Ben Jipcho (KEN)	Christchurch
1975	13:18.6 h	Emiel Puttemans (BEL)	Papendal
1976	13:13.10	Dick Quax (NZL)	Stockholm
1977	13:12.86	Dick Quax (NZL)	Stockholm
1978	13:08.4 h	Henry Rono (KEN)	Berkeley
1979	13:12.29	Suleiman Nyambui (TAN)	Stockholm
1980	13:16.38	Miruts Yifter (ETH)	Bratislava
1981	13:06.20	Henry Rono (KEN)	Knarvik
1982	13:00.41	David Moorcroft (GBR)	Oslo
1983	13:08.54	Fernando Mamede (POR)	Tokyo
1984	13:04.78	Saïd Aouita (MAR)	Florence
1985	13:00.40	Saïd Aouita (MAR)	Oslo
1986	13:00.86	Saïd Aouita (MAR)	A Coruña
1987	12:58.39	Saïd Aouita (MAR)	Rome
1988	13:11.70	John Ngugi (KEN)	Seoul
1989	13:04.24	Yobes Ondieki (KEN)	Oslo
1990	13:05.59	Salvatore Antibo (ITA)	Bologna
1991	13:01.82	Yobes Ondieki (KEN)	Zürich
1992	13:00.93	Moses Kiptanui (KEN)	Brussels
1993	13:02.75	Ismael Kirui (KEN)	Stuttgart
1994	12:56.96	Haile Gebrselassie (ETH)	Hengelo
1995	12:44.39	Haile Gebrselassie (ETH)	Zürich
1996	12:45.09	Daniel Komen (KEN)	Zürich
1997	12:39.74	Daniel Komen (KEN)	Brussels
1998	12:39.36	Haile Gebrselassie (ETH)	Helsinki
1999	12:49.64	Haile Gebrselassie (ETH)	Zürich
2000	12:49.28	Brahim Lahlafi (MAR)	Brussels
2001	12:56.72	Richard Limo (KEN)	Zürich
2002	12:55.85	Salah Hissou (MAR)	Rome
2003	12:48.81	Stephen Cherono (KEN)	Ostrava
2004	12:37.35	Kenenisa Bekele (ETH)	Hengelo
2005	12:40.18	Kenenisa Bekele (ETH)	Saint-Denis
2006	12:48.09	Kenenisa Bekele (ETH)	Brussels
2007	12:49.53	Kenenisa Bekele (ETH)	Zaragoza
2008	12:50.18	Kenenisa Bekele (ETH)	Zürich
2009	12:52.32	Kenenisa Bekele (ETH)	Zürich
2010	12:51.21	Eliud Kipchoge (KEN)	Doha
2011	12:53.11	Mo Farah (GBR)	Monaco
2012	12:46.81	Dejen Gebremeskel (ETH)	Saint-Denis
2013	12:51.34	Edwin Soi (KEN)	Monaco
2014	12:54.83	Muktar Edris (ETH)	Stockholm
2015	12:53.98	Yomif Kejelcha (ETH)	Rome
2016	12:59.29	Mo Farah (GBR)	London
2017	12:55.23	Muktar Edris (ETH)	Lausanne
2018	12:43.02	Selemon Barega (ETH)	Brussels
2019	12:52.98	Telahun Haile Bekele (ETH)	Rome
2020	12:35.36	Joshua Cheptegei (UGA)	Monaco
2021	12:48.45	Jakob Ingebrigtsen (NOR)	Florence
2022	12:45.71	Jacob Krop (KEN)	Brussels
2023	12:40.45	Berihu Aregawi (ETH)	Lausanne
2024	12:36.73	Hagos Gebrhiwet (ETH)	Oslo
2025	12:44.09 i	Grant Fisher (USA)	Boston
2026	12:45.70	Birhanu Balew (BHR)	Brussels

=== Women ===
Year	Time	Athlete	Place
1960	—	—	—
1961	—	—	—
1962	—	—	—
1963	—	—	—
1964	—	—	—
1965	—	—	—
1966	—	—	—
1967	—	—	—
1968	—	—	—
1969	15:53.6	Paola Pigni (ITA)	Milan
1970	—	—	—
1971	—	—	—
1972	—	—	—
1973	—	—	—
1974	—	—	—
1975	—	—	—
1976	16:04.2	Nina Holmén (FIN)	Jakobstad
1977	15:37.0	Jan Merrill (USA)	Ingelheim
1978	15:35.52	Kathy Mills (USA)	Knoxville
1979	15:33.8	Jan Merrill (USA)	Durham
1980	15:30.6	Jan Merrill (USA)	Palo Alto
1981	15:14.51	Paula Fudge (GBR)	Knarvik
1982	15:08.26	Mary Slaney (USA)	Eugene
1983	15:10.65	Zola Budd (RSA)	Port Elizabeth
1984	14:58.89	Ingrid Kristiansen (NOR)	Oslo
1985	14:48.07	Zola Budd (GBR)	London
1986	14:37.33	Ingrid Kristiansen (NOR)	Stockholm
1987	15:01.08	Liz McColgan (GBR)	Oslo
1988	15:03.29	Liz McColgan (GBR)	Berlin
1989	14:59.01	Kathrin Weßel (GDR)	Stockholm
1990	15:02.23	Yelena Romanova (URS)	Seattle
1991	14:49.35	Elana Meyer (RSA)	Cape Town
1992	14:44.15	Elana Meyer (RSA)	Bellville
1993	14:45.92	Sonia O'Sullivan (IRL)	Berlin
1994	15:05.94	Yelena Romanova (RUS)	Stockholm
1995	14:36.45	Fernanda Ribeiro (POR)	Hechtel
1996	14:41.07	Fernanda Ribeiro (POR)	Oslo
1997	14:28.09	Jiang Bo (CHN)	Shanghai
1998	14:31.48	Gabriela Szabo (ROU)	Berlin
1999	14:40.59	Gabriela Szabo (ROU)	Berlin
2000	14:30.88	Getenesh Wami (ETH)	Heusden
2001	14:29.32	Olga Yegorova (RUS)	Berlin
2002	14:31.42	Paula Radcliffe (GBR)	Manchester
2003	14:29.32	Berhane Adere (ETH)	Oslo
2004	14:24.68	Elvan Abeylegesse (TUR)	Bergen
2005	14:28.98	Meseret Defar (ETH)	Brussels
2006	14:24.53	Meseret Defar (ETH)	New York City
2007	14:16.63	Meseret Defar (ETH)	Oslo
2008	14:11.15	Tirunesh Dibaba (ETH)	Oslo
2009	14:24.37 i	Meseret Defar (ETH)	Stockholm
2010	14:24.79 i	Meseret Defar (ETH)	Stockholm
2011	14:20.87	Vivian Cheruiyot (KEN)	Stockholm
2012	14:35.62	Vivian Cheruiyot (KEN)	Rome
2013	14:23.68	Tirunesh Dibaba (ETH)	Saint-Denis
2014	14:28.88	Genzebe Dibaba (ETH)	Monaco
2015	14:14.32	Almaz Ayana (ETH)	Shanghai
2016	14:12.59	Almaz Ayana (ETH)	Rome
2017	14:18.37	Hellen Obiri (KEN)	Rome
2018	14:21.75	Hellen Obiri (KEN)	Rabat
2019	14:20.36	Hellen Obiri (KEN)	London
2020	14:06.62	Letesenbet Gidey (ETH)	Valencia
2021	14:13.32	Gudaf Tsegay (ETH)	Hengelo
2022	14:12.98	Ejgayehu Taye (ETH)	Eugene
2023	14:00.21	Gudaf Tsegay (ETH)	Eugene
2024	14:09.52	Beatrice Chebet (KEN)	Zurich
2025	13:58.06	Beatrice Chebet (KEN)	Eugene
2026	14:18.41	Likina Amebaw (ETH)	Rome

== See also ==
- National records in the 5000 metres
- List of 5000 metres national champions (men)
- List of 5000 metres national champions (women)
- 5000 metres world record progression
