= 2026 World Athletics Ultimate Championship – Men's 1500 metres =

Men's 1500 metres at the 2026 World Athletics Ultimate Championship
- Venue: National Athletics Centre
- Location: Budapest, Hungary
- Dates: 13 September 2026 (final)
- Competitors: 11 from 7 nations
- Winning time: 3:29.35 min

Champion
- Josh Kerr; Great Britain

The men's 1500 metres was held as a straight final at the 2026 World Athletics Ultimate Championship at the National Athletics Centre in Budapest, Hungary on 13 September 2026. It was the first time the World Ultimate Championship is held. Athletes qualified by wildcard or by their world ranking.

== Background ==
Global records before the 2026 World Athletics Ultimate Championship
Record	Time	Athlete (nation)	Location	Date
World record	3:26.00	Hicham El Guerrouj (MAR)	Rome, Italy	14 July 1998
World lead	3:27.62	Josh Kerr (GBR)	London, United Kingdom	18 July 2026

Area records before the 2026 World Athletics Ultimate Championship
Record	Time	Athlete (nation)	Location	Date
African record	3:26.00	Hicham El Guerrouj (MAR)	Rome, Italy	14 July 1998
Asian record	3:29.14	Rashid Ramzi (BHR)	Rome, Italy	14 July 2006
European record	3:26.73	Jakob Ingebrigtsen (NOR)	Fontvieille, Monaco	12 July 2024
North, Central American, and Caribbean record	3:27.65	Cole Hocker (USA)	Paris, France	6 August 2024
Oceanian record	3:28.00	Cameron Myers (AUS)	Paris, France	28 June 2026
South American record	3:33.25	Hudson Santos de Souza (BRA)	Rieti, Italy	28 August 2005

== Qualification ==
For the 1500 metres, twelve athletes qualified, up to three by wildcard for winners of the event at the 2024 Summer Olympic, the 2025 World Athletics Championships, or the 2026 Diamond League final and the others by their position at the World Athletics Rankings for the event on 3 September 2026.

== Results ==
=== Final ===
The final was held on 13 September at 20:12 (UTC+2).

Place	Athlete	Nation	Time	Notes
1st place, gold medalist(s)	Josh Kerr	Great Britain	3:29.35	
2	Cameron Myers	Australia	3:29.68	
3	Hobbs Kessler	United States	3:30.73	
4	Cole Hocker	United States	3:30.74	SB
5	Yared Nuguse	United States	3:30.76	
6	Azeddine Habz	France	3:30.96	
7	Ethan Strand	United States	3:31.30	
8	Timothy Cheruiyot	Kenya	3:31.47	
9	Jake Wightman	Great Britain	3:31.56	
10	Phanuel Koech	Kenya	3:31.77	
11	Robert Farken	Germany	3:32.90	
12	Isaac Nader	Portugal	3:39.54	
—	Jakob Ingebrigtsen	Norway	DNS	
