= Phanuel Koech =

Kenyan athlete (born 2006)

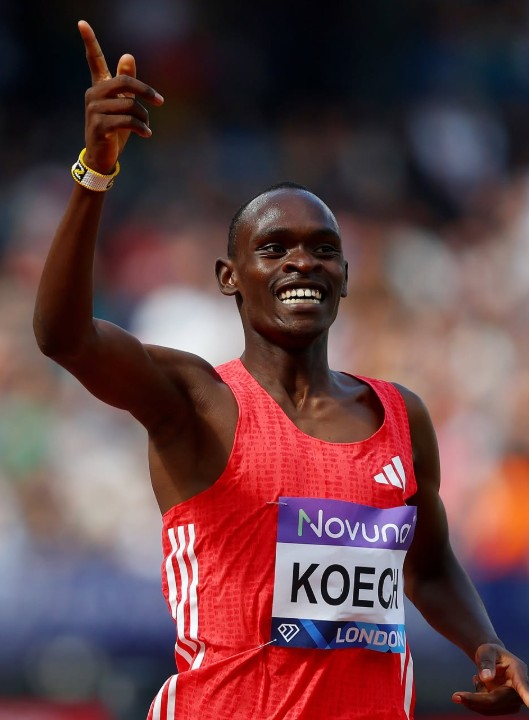

Personal information
- Nationality: Kenyan
- Born: Phanuel Kipkosgei Koech; 1 December 2006 (age 19) Kewapmwai, Uasin Gishu County, Kenya

Sport
- Sport: Athletics
- Events: 800m, 1500m
- Coached by: Claudio Berardelli

Achievements and titles
- Personal bests: 800 m: 1:46.93 (Nairobi 2024); 1500 m: 3:27.72 WU20R (Paris 2025)
Medal record
Men's athletics
Representing Kenya
Diamond League Final
| Second place | 2026 Brussels | 1500 m |

Phanuel Kipkosgei Koech (born 1 December 2006) is a Kenyan middle-distance runner. In June 2025, as an 18-year-old, he ran a world under-20 record of 3:27.72 in the 1500 metres.

He is coached by Claudio Berardelli, who also coaches Emmanuel Wanyonyi.

== Early life ==
Koech was born in Kewapmwai, a village in Uasin Gishu County, Kenya. He is the youngest of 10 siblings and was raised by his mother Roselyne after his father died prior to his birth. He began running at Primary School before attending St. Francis Kimuron School near Iten, a school that was previously attended by David Rudisha and Emmanuel Korir.

== Career ==
He won the Boys Under-18 title during the World Schools Cross Country Championships at the Ngong Race Course on May 12, 2024.

He ran a 800 metres personal best of 1:46.93 at the Kenyan U20 trials in Nairobi in June 2024. He competed at the 2024 World Athletics U20 Championships over 800 metres in Lima, Peru, placing fifth in the final. He finished third behind race winner Emmanuel Wanyonyi at the Athletics Kenya 2 km cross country race in Iten in November 2024.

Having signed with Adidas and declined opportunities to enter the collegiate system in the United States, Koech was part of a training group in Iten coached by Gabriele Nicola before joining Claudio Berardelli's coaching group, also containing Wanyonyi, in March 2025.

In June 2025, he ran a personal best of 3:32.26 for the 1500 metres at the Lucca International Meeting, a World Athletics Continental Tour Challenger event. Competing 1500 metres at the 2025 Meeting de Paris on 20 June he ran a world under-20 record time of 3:27.72. It was just his second competitive race at the distance. He ran 3:29.05 to win the 1500 metres at the Golden Spike Ostrava on 24 June. He ran 3:28.82 to win the 1500m at the 2025 London Athletics Meet ahead of reigning world champion over that distance, Josh Kerr on 19 July. He ran 3:31.41 to finish runner-up to Niels Laros in the Diamond League event at the 2025 Memorial Van Damme, in Brussels, Belgium, on 22 August. He placed third in the 1500m at the Diamond League Final in Zurich on 28 August, in 3:30.02.

In September 2025, he competed at the 2025 World Championships in Tokyo, Japan, without advancing to the semi-finals. In November, he was nominated for the World Athletics Rising Star Award.

Koech missed the early part of the 2026 season with a stress fracture. On 14 July, he won the 1500 metres in 3:31.09 ahead of compatriot Danson Kiplangat in a close finish at the István Gyulai Memorial, in Budapest. It was his first international race of the year. On 23 August, he placed second to Ethan Strand over 1500 m in the Diamond League at the 2026 Kamila Skolimowska Memorial in Silesia, Poland. On 27 August, he was runner-up to Cole Hocker over 1500 metres the 2026 Weltklasse Zürich. At the 2026 Diamond League Final in Brussels on 4 September, Koech placed second in the 1500 metres, four hundredths of a second behind Cam Myers of Australia. Later that month, he placed tenth over 1500 m at the inaugural World Ultimate Championship in Budapest.
