= Azeddine Habz =

French runner (born 1993)

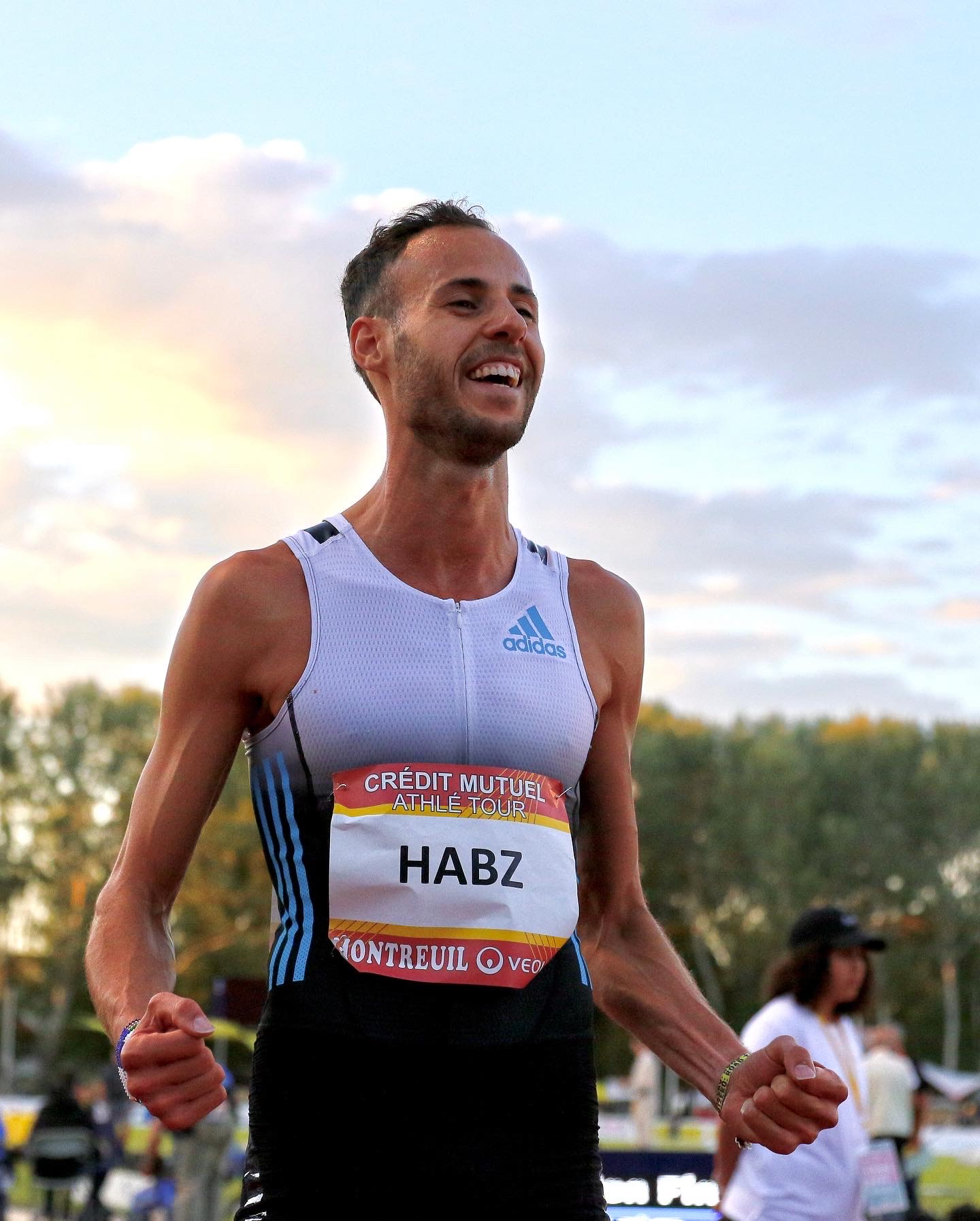
- Habz in Montreuil in 2022

Personal information
- Nationality: French
- Born: 19 July 1993 (age 33) Oulad Nacer, Morocco
- Height: 1.86 m (6 ft 1 in)
- Weight: 70 kg (154 lb)

Sport
- Country: France
- Sport: Athletics
- Events: Middle-, long-distance running
- Club: Val d'Europe Athlétisme Montévrain
Medal record
Men's athletics
Representing France
European Indoor Championships
Silver medal – second place	2025 Apeldoorn	1500 m
Bronze medal – third place	2025 Apeldoorn	3000 m
Bronze medal – third place	2023 Istanbul	1500 m
European Cross Country Championships
Silver medal – second place	2021 Dublin	Mixed relay
Bronze medal – third place	2022 Turin	Mixed relay

Azeddine Habz (born 19 July 1993) is a French middle- and long-distance runner. He won silver and bronze medals in the 1500 metres at the 2025 and 2023 European Indoor Championships.

== Personal life ==
Habz was brought up in Morocco before relocating to France in 2012. He received French citizenship and began representing France in August 2018. He studied sociology at the University of Paris.

== Career ==
In October 2018, Habz became the French half marathon champion. On 29 February 2020, he won the 3000 metres at the French Indoor Championships in a time of 7:57.20. He was selected to run for France at the delayed 2020 Summer Olympics in Tokyo in the 1500 metres race.

Habz competing at the European Cross Country Championships

Selected for the 1500m at the 2023 World Athletics Championships, he qualified for the final, in which he finished eleventh. In September 2023, he set a new national record for the mile, running 3:48.64 at the Diamond League final in Eugene, Oregon.

On 10 February 2024, Habz ran 3:34.39 over 1500m indoors in Lievin, improving the French national record set by Mehdi Baala from 2009, by 0.32 seconds. He won the 1500 metres at the 2024 Diamond League event 2024 Meeting International Mohammed VI d'Athlétisme in Rabat.

Despite initially being mistakenly left off the submitted list of competitors by the French Federation and having to be instated following appeal, he qualified for the final of the 1500 metres at the 2024 European Athletics Championships. In July 2024, he ran a 1:43.79 personal best in the 800 metres at the 2024 Meeting de Paris. He competed at the 2024 Summer Olympics over 1500 metres.

On 2 February 2025, he set a new personal best of 7:31.75 over 3000 metres at the New Balance Indoor Grand Prix. Later that month, he ran a French record of 3:47.56 in the Wanamaker Mile at the Millrose Games in New York City. En route to the mile, Habz split 3:32.24 for 1500 metres, improving his indoor 1500 metre French record. He was selected for the 2025 European Athletics Indoor Championships in Appeldoorn, where he won a silver medal in the 1500 metres. The following day, he also qualified for the final of the 3000 metres race.

On 6 June 2025, he ran 3:29.72 to win the 1500 metres at the 2025 Golden Gala in Rome. He set a new French national record over 1500 metres in the 2025 Diamond League at the 2025 Meeting de Paris, running 3:27.49 on 20 June 2025. He ran a French record of 3:46.65 in the Bowerman Mile to finish third at the 2025 Prefontaine Classic on 5 July. He placed fifth over 1500 metres at the Diamond League Final in Zurich on 28 August. In September 2025, he competed at the 2025 World Championships in Tokyo, Japan, without advancing to the semi-finals.

Habz won the 3000 metres title at the 2026 French Indoor Athletics Championships in Aubiere. He was selected for the 2026 World Athletics Indoor Championships in Poland, placing eleventh in the 3000 metres in 7:39.87. In May, he finished third in 3:30.68 in the 1500 metres in the 2026 Diamond League meeting in Rabat. On 28 June, Habz finished second to Cam Myers in 3:29.80 at the 2026 Meeting de Paris. In August, he competed at the 2026 European Athletics Championships in Birmingham, England, placing tenth in the final of the 1500 metres. In September, he placed sixth over 1500 m at the inaugural World Ultimate Championship in Budapest.

== Achievements ==
=== International competitions ===
Representing France
Year	Competition	Venue	Position	Event	Time
2019	European Cross Country Championships	Lisbon, Portugal	36th	Senior race	31:47
2021	European Indoor Championships	Toruń, Poland	22nd (h)	1500 m	3:41.55
2021	Olympic Games	Tokyo, Japan	17th (sf)	1500 m	3:35.12
2021	European Cross Country Championships	Dublin, Ireland	2nd	Mixed relay	18:05
2022	Mediterranean Games	Oran, Algeria	1st	1500 m	3:41.65
2022	European Championships	Munich, Germany	10th	1500 m	3:40.92
2022	European Cross Country Championships	Turin, Italy	3rd	Mixed relay	17:31
2023	European Indoor Championships	Istanbul, Turkey	3rd	1500 m	3:35.39
2023	World Championships	Budapest, Hungary	11th	1500 m	3:33.14
2024	European Championships	Rome, Italy	7th	1500 m	3:33.70
2024	Olympic Games	Paris, France	19th (h)	1500 m	3:34.35
2025	European Indoor Championships	Apeldoorn, Netherlands	2nd	1500 m	3:36.92
2025	World Championships	Tokyo, Japan	7th (h)	1500 m	3:36.62
2026	World Indoor Championships	Toruń, Poland	11th	3000 m	7:39.87
2026	European Championships	Birmingham, United Kingdom	10th	1500 m	3:37.61
2026	World Ultimate Championship	Budapest, Hungary	6th	1500 m	3:30.96

=== National titles ===
- French Athletics Championships
  - 1500 metres: 2022
- French Indoor Athletics Championships
  - 1500 metres: 2022, 2023
  - 3000 metres: 2020
- French Cross Country Championships: 2018, 2023
- French Half Marathon Championships: 2018

== Personal bests ==
=== Outdoor ===
As of 23 June 2025

Event	Performance	Location	Date
800 metres	1:43.79	Paris	7 July 2024
1500 metres	3:27.49 NR	Paris	20 June 2025
Mile	3:46.65 NR	Eugene	5 July 2025
5000 metres	13:38.00	Lede	25 May 2019
5 kilometres (road)	13:43	Monaco	16 February 2020
10 kilometres (road)	27:44	Nice	5 January 2025
Half marathon	1:04.53	Ústí nad Labem	19 September 2020

=== Indoor ===
As of 23 June 2025

Event	Performance	Location	Date
1500 metres	3:32.24 NR	New York City	8 February 2025
2000 metres	4:57.22 NB	Liévin	17 February 2022
3000 metres	7:31.50	Boston	2 February 2025
Mile	3:47.56 NR	New York City	8 February 2025
