= Parker Wolfe =

American long-distance runner (born 2003)

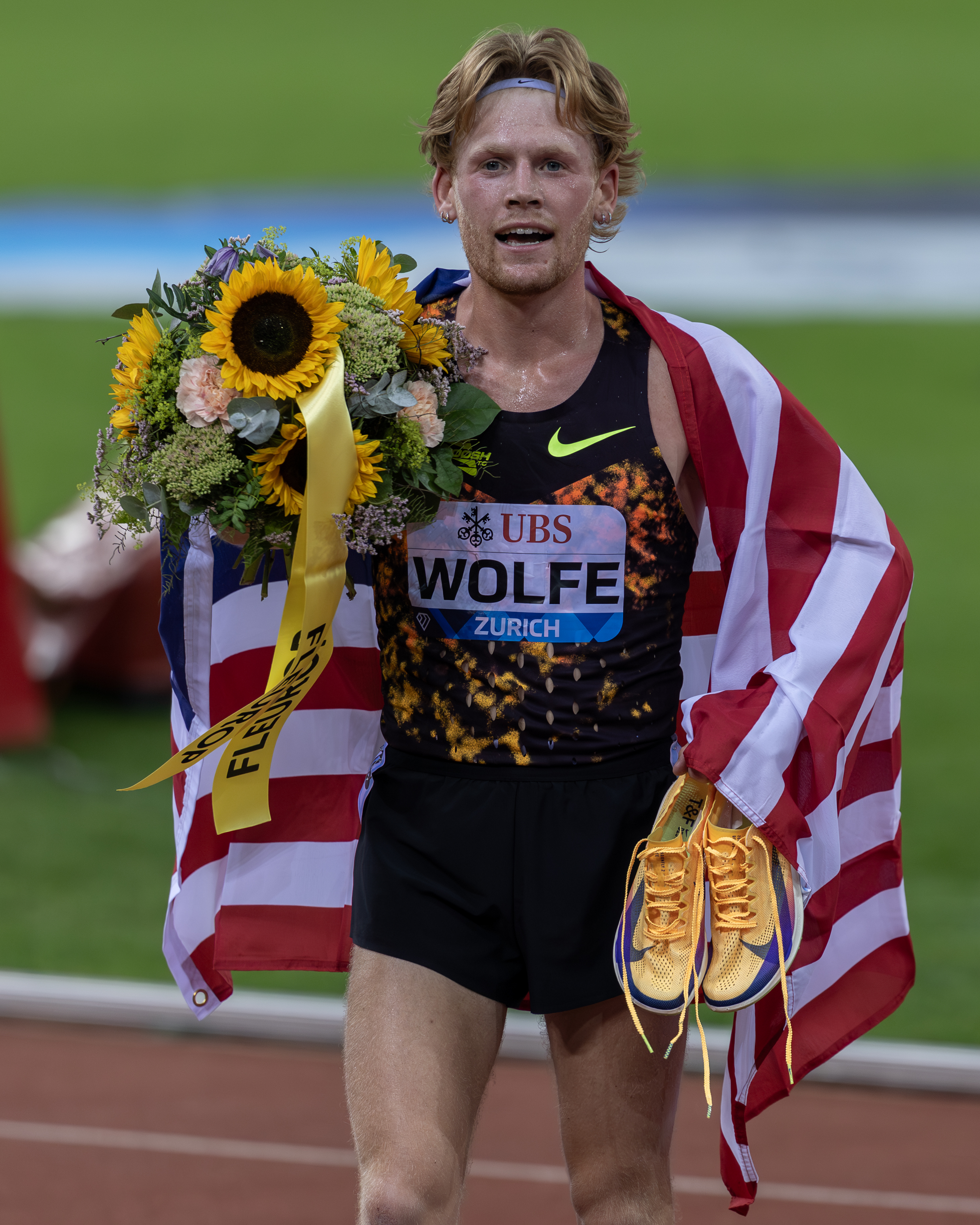
- Wolfe competing at the 2026 Weltklasse Zürich

Personal information
- Nationality: United States
- Born: July 27, 2003 (age 23)
- Home town: Denver, Colorado, U.S.
- Education: Cherry Creek High School
- Height: 5 ft 7 in (170 cm)

Sport
- Country: United States
- Sport: Track and field
- Event: 1500 m–10,000 m
- University team: North Carolina Tar Heels
- Turned pro: 2025
- Coached by: Chris Miltenberg (2021-2025); Mike Smith (2025-)

Achievements and titles
- Personal bests: 1500 m: 3:33.46 (Los Angeles 2026); Mile: 3:54.17 (Boston 2024); 3000 m: 7:27.43 (Zurich 2026); 5000 m: 12:49.45 (Oslo 2026); 10,000 m: 28:51.09 (Winston-Salem 2024)
Medal record
Men's athletics
Representing the United States
World Ultimate Championship
Third place	2026 Budapest	5000 m

Parker Wolfe (born July 27, 2003) is an American middle and long-distance runner. He was the 5000 m champion at the 2024 NCAA Outdoor Track and Field Championships. Since 2025, Wolfe has competed professionally for Nike.

== Career ==
In high school, Wolfe was a multiple time state champion for Cherry Creek High School in Denver, Colorado. He won the 2020 RunningLane National Championships in 14:26.94. He was also awarded the 2021 National Gatorade Player of the Year for cross country.

He competed for the University of North Carolina at Chapel Hill. During his freshman year in 2021, he placed 28th at the NCAA Division I cross country championships, followed by a ninth-place finish the following year. In 2023, he set a school record in the indoor 5000 meters with a time of 13:19.73. He finished fifth in the same event at both the indoor and outdoor national championships. In December 2023, he broke his own school record for the indoor 5k at Boston with a time of 13:13.61. In March 2024, he finished second to Nico Young in both the 3000 and 5000 meters at the NCAA Indoor Championships. In June, he won his first national title, outkicking Ky Robinson and Nico Young to take the 5000 meters with a time of 13:54.43.

At the 2024 U.S. Olympic trials, Wolfe placed third in the 5,000 m behind Grant Fisher and Abdihamid Nur in 13:10.75. However, Wolfe lacked a sufficient time or world ranking to compete at the Olympics.

In October 2024, Wolfe signed an NIL deal with Nike alongside fellow Tar Heel teammate Ethan Strand.

On December 7, 2024, in Boston, Wolfe ran 7:30.23 in the indoor 3000 meters, finishing just behind teammate Ethan Strand, who broke the NCAA record with a time of 7:30.15.

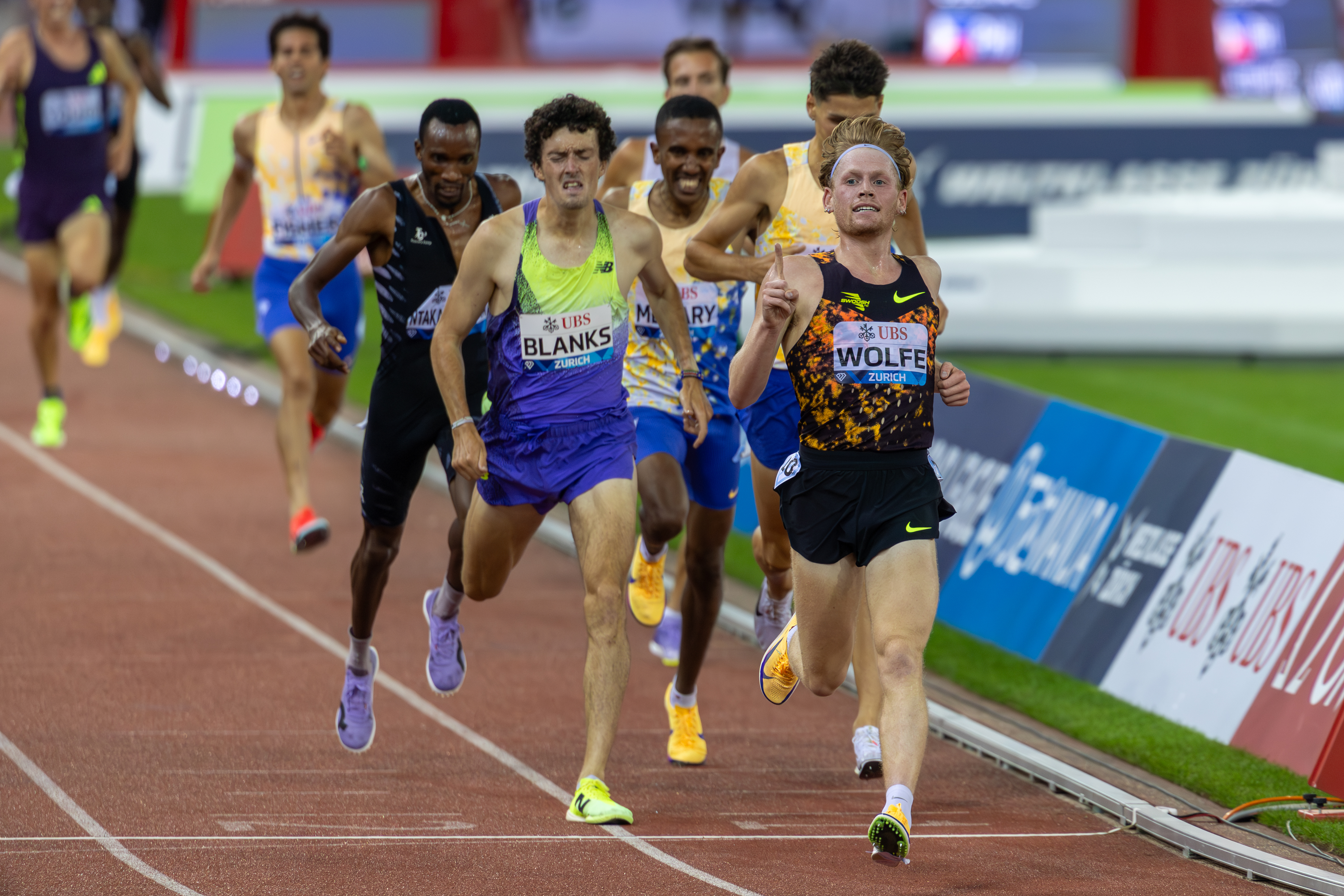
Wolfe wins the 3000 m at the 2026 Weltklasse Zürich.

== Results and records ==
Championship results

Year	Competition	Venue	Distance	Place	Time
2021	NCAA XC Championships	Tallahassee, FL	10 km	28th	29:25.8
2022	NCAA XC Championships	Stillwater, OK	10 km	9th	29:00.4
2023	NCAA Indoor Championships	Albuquerque Convention Center	5000 m	5th	13:43.69
2023	NCAA Outdoor Championships	Hayward Field	5000 m	5th	14:07.50
2023	NCAA XC Championships	Charlottesville, Virginia	10 km	9th	29:13
2024	NCAA Indoor Championships	The TRACK at New Balance	3000 m	2nd	7:42.38
2024	NCAA Indoor Championships	The TRACK at New Balance	5000 m	2nd	13:27.37
2024	NCAA Outdoor Championships	Hayward Field	5000 m	1st	13:54.43
2024	US Olympic Trials	Hayward Field	5000 m	3rd	13:10.75
2024	NCAA XC Championships	Madison, Wisconsin	10 km	7th	28:50.2
2025	2025-2026 USATF XC Championship	Glendoveer Golf Course Portland OR	10,000 m	1st	29:16.4
