= 2026 World Athletics Indoor Championships – Men's 3000 metres =

Men's 3000 metres at the 2026 World Athletics Indoor Championships
- Venue: Kujawsko-Pomorska Arena Toruń
- Location: Toruń, Poland
- Dates: 21 March
- Winning time: 7:35.56

Medalists
gold medal	Josh Kerr	Great Britain
silver medal	Cole Hocker	United States
bronze medal	Yann Schrub	France

The men's 3000 metres at the 2026 World Athletics Indoor Championships took place on the short track of the Kujawsko-Pomorska Arena Toruń in Toruń, Poland, on 21 March 2026. This was the 22nd time the event was contested at the World Athletics Indoor Championships. Athletes could qualify by achieving the entry standard or by their World Athletics Ranking in the event.

== Background ==
The men's 3000 metres was contested 21 times before 2026, at every previous edition of the World Athletics Indoor Championships.

Records before the 2026 World Athletics Indoor Championships
Record	Athlete (nation)	Time (s)	Location	Date
World record	Grant Fisher (USA)	7:22.91	New York City, United States	8 February 2025
Championship record	Haile Gebrselassie (ETH)	7:34.71	Paris, France	9 March 1997
2026 World Lead	Cameron Myers (AUS)	7:27.57	Boston, United States	24 January 2026

== Qualification ==
For the men's 3000 metres, the qualification period ran from 1 November 2025 until 8 March 2026. Athletes could qualify by achieving the entry standard of 7:33.00 s. Athletes could also qualify by virtue of their World Athletics Ranking for the event or by virtue of their World Athletics Indoor Tour wildcard. There is a target number of 15 athletes.

== Results ==
=== Final ===
The final was held on 21 March, starting at 19:22 (UTC+1) in the evening.

Place	Athlete	Nation	Time	Notes
1st place, gold medalist(s)	Josh Kerr	United Kingdom	7:35.56	SB
2nd place, silver medalist(s)	Cole Hocker	United States	7:35.70	SB
3rd place, bronze medalist(s)	Yann Schrub	France	7:35.71	
4	Jacob Krop	Kenya	7:36.76	
5	Yared Nuguse	United States	7:37.08	
6	Valentín Soca	Uruguay	7:37.10	SB
7	Luan Munnik	South Africa	7:37.94	PB
8	Addisu Yihune	Ethiopia	7:38.60	
9	Nick Griggs	Ireland	7:39.03	
10	Pol Oriach	Spain	7:39.78	
11	Azeddine Habz	France	7:39.87	
12	Getnet Wale	Ethiopia	7:40.21	
13	Andrew Coscoran	Ireland	7:43.89	
14	Geordie Beamish	New Zealand	7:45.05	
15	Alexander Tesfay	Eritrea	7:48.24	PB
