= Cole Hocker =

American middle-distance runner (born 2001)

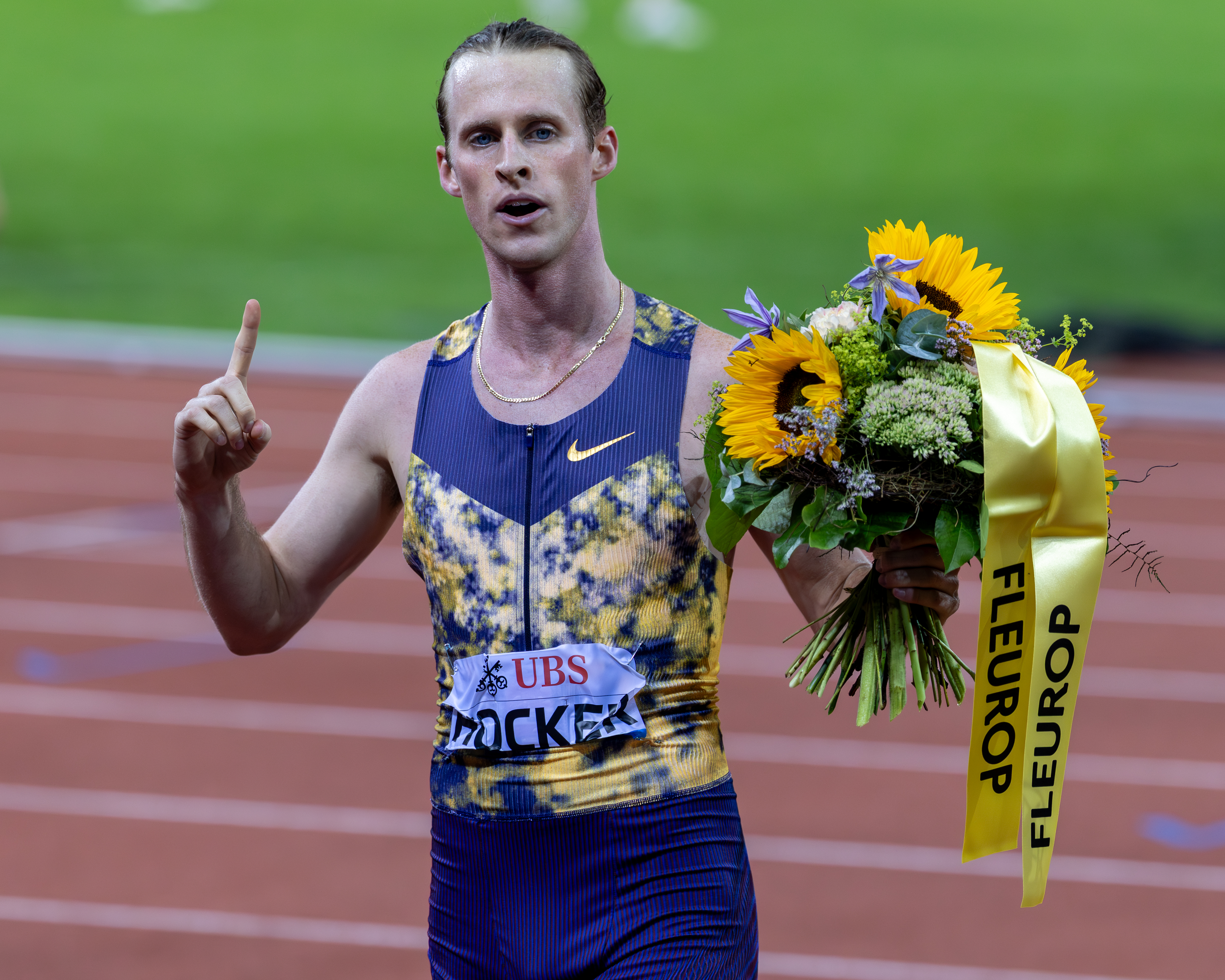
- Hocker at the 2026 Weltklasse Zürich

Personal information
- Born: June 6, 2001 (age 25) Indianapolis, Indiana, U.S.
- Education: Cathedral High School; University of Oregon
- Height: 5 ft 10 in (178 cm)

Sport
- Country: United States
- Sport: Track and field
- Events: 800 m, 1500 m, mile, 3000 m, 5000 m
- College team: Oregon Ducks
- Team: Nike
- Turned pro: 2021
- Coached by: Ben Thomas

Achievements and titles
- Olympic finals: 2024 Paris; 1500 m, 1st
- Personal bests: Outdoor; 800 m: 1:45.13 (Miramar 2025); 1500 m: 3:27.65 OR, AR (Paris Olympics 2024); Mile: 3:47.43 (Eugene 2025); 3000 m: 7:42.93 (Leuven 2023); 5000 m: 12:58.30 (World Athletics Championships 2025); Indoor; 800 m: 1:48.44i (Fayetteville 2021); 1500 m: 3:30.80+i AR (Winston-Salem 2026); Mile: 3:45.94i AR (Winston-Salem 2026); 2000 m: 4:52.92i (Blacksburg 2026); 3000 m: 7:23.14i (New York City 2025); Two miles: 8:05.70i (New York City 2024); 5000 m: 12:57.82i (Boston 2025)
Medal record
Men's athletics
Representing the United States
Olympic Games
Gold medal – first place	2024 Paris	1500 m
World Championships
Gold medal – first place	2025 Tokyo	5000 m
World Ultimate Championship
Second place	2026 Budapest	5000 m
World Indoor Championships
Silver medal – second place	2024 Glasgow	1500 m
Silver medal – second place	2026 Toruń	3000 m

Cole Hocker (born June 6, 2001) is an American middle- and long-distance runner. In the 1500 meters, he won the gold medal at the 2024 Summer Olympics in Paris, setting an Olympic record and an area record of 3:27.65. In the 5000 meters, he won a world title at the 2025 World Championships in Tokyo. Hocker holds the North American record over the 1500 meter distance alongside the short track 1500 meters and mile. He also holds the second-fastest time in history over the short track 3000 meters, at 7:23.14.

Hocker holds multiple national titles in annual competitions held by USA Track & Field, including four titles in the 1500 m, one title in the 3000 meters, and one title in the 5000 m. In March 2024, he won a silver medal in the 1500 m at the 2024 World Athletics Indoor Championships in Glasgow, Scotland. Hocker also placed sixth in the 1500 m at the 2020 Summer Olympics in Tokyo and seventh at the 2023 World Championships in Budapest, Hungary.

In high school, Hocker won several high-level competitions including the Foot Locker Cross Country Championships in 2018. Beginning in 2019, he competed for the University of Oregon, where he won four NCAA titles. Hocker announced in 2021 that he would forgo his remaining NCAA eligibility to run professionally, signing with Nike.

== Background and youth sports ==
Hocker was born on June 6, 2001, in Indianapolis, Indiana, to Janet (née Davis), a lawyer, and Kyle Hocker, a teacher. He began running competitively at a young age, recording a time of 4:36 for the mile as an eighth grader. He attended Cathedral High School in Indianapolis, where he won multiple state- and national-level races. He was second in the 2017 IHSAA Cross Country State Finals and won in '18. He finished second at the 2018 Nike Cross Nationals, and he won the 2018 Foot Locker Cross Country Championships. For college, he chose the University of Oregon over offers from many other schools including Northern Arizona University and Indiana University.

== Collegiate competition ==
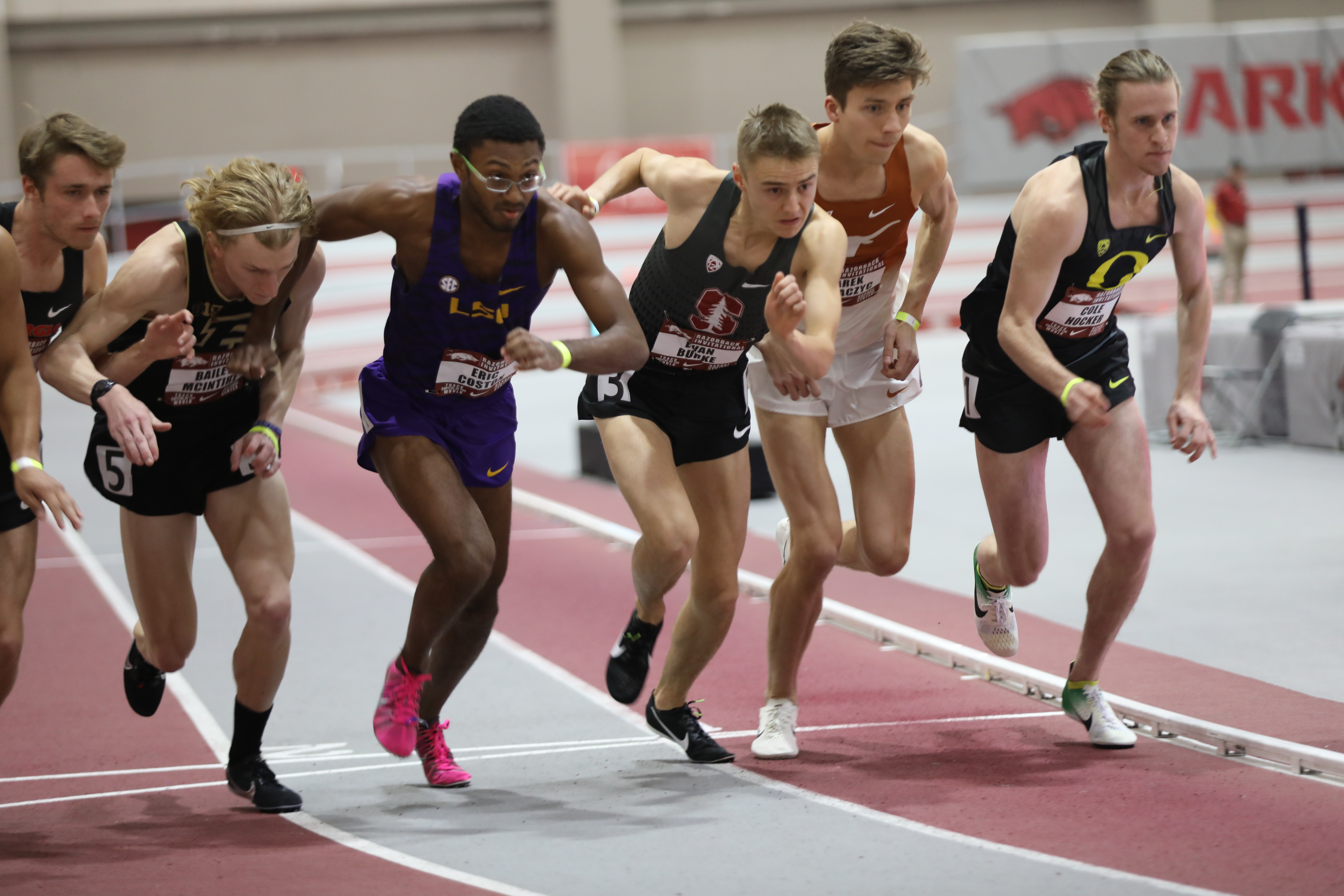
Hocker (right) competes for the Oregon Ducks in 2020.

Hocker ran for the Oregon Ducks from 2019 to 2021. At the 2021 NCAA Division I Indoor Track and Field Championships, he won the mile in 3:53.71 and the 3000 meters in 7:46.15. Earlier that year, he ran a personal best of 3:50.55 in the mile on February 12, 2021, finishing in a close second to teammate Cooper Teare at a meet at the Randal Tyson Track Center. The two set the seventh and eighth all-time fastest performances for the indoor mile.

At the 2021 NCAA Division I Outdoor Track and Field Championships, Hocker won the 1500 meters in a time of 3:35.35, outkicking NCAA record holder Yared Nuguse. He also finished 4th in the 5000 meters in a time of 13:18.95. At the 2020 United States Olympic Trials, Hocker won the 1500 m final ahead of Matthew Centrowitz and Yared Nuguse. Hocker did not have the Olympic qualifying time; however, he qualified for the Games based on his world ranking position.

At the 2020 Olympic Games, Hocker placed 6th in the 1500 m with a time of 3:31.40, setting a new personal best. His time was under the Olympic Record set 2 days prior in the semifinals by Abel Kipsang of Kenya. Hocker qualified for the semifinals by running 3:36.16 for 4th in his heat. He then ran 3:33.87, then a personal best placing 2nd in his semifinal to qualify for the final.

== Senior competition ==
=== 2021 ===
On September 13, 2021, Hocker announced his decision to turn professional, forgoing his further participation on the University of Oregon team. Hocker became a Nike-sponsored athlete, and continues to be based in Oregon training under coach Ben Thomas. Hocker made his professional debut at the 2022 Millrose Games, where he competed in the 3,000 meter race. He ran a personal record of 7:39.83, placing third behind Geordie Beamish and teammate Cooper Teare. Two weeks later at Gately Park in Chicago, in a bid for the American indoor mile record of 3:49.98, Teare and Hocker ran personal bests of 3:50.17 and 3:50.35 to place first and second.

=== 2022 ===
At the 2022 USA Indoor Track and Field Championships in Spokane, Washington, Hocker doubled in the 1,500 meter and 3,000 meter events. He earned his second and third national titles, running a meet record time of 3:39.09 in the 1500 m. However, he opted not to compete in the 2022 World Athletics Indoor Championships in Belgrade, Serbia, turning his focus instead to the outdoor championships in July. An injury at the US National Track and Field championships in June 2022, prevented him from qualifying in the 1500 m for the World Outdoor Championships.

=== 2023 ===
Hocker finished third at the 2023 USA Outdoor Track and Field Championships, qualifying him for the 2023 World Athletics Championships in Budapest. He placed 7th at the world championship final, en route to a new personal best of 3:30.7. In September 2023, Hocker competed in the mile of the Diamond League final at the Prefontaine Classic. He did not have enough Diamond League points to qualify, but the meet organizers entered him as a national wildcard, based on a rule which allows the host nation to enter an athlete who is of adequate standing in each event. In the race, Hocker finished sixth in a personal best of 3:48.08, the fourth fastest time ever run by an American in the mile.

=== 2024: Olympic 1500 meter champion ===
In February, Hocker ran 8:05.70 in the indoor 2-mile at the Millrose Games in New York City. He finished third behind compatriot Grant Fisher, who broke the American record in the event, and Scotsman Josh Kerr, who broke the world record. Hocker's time was also under the previous American record of 8:07.41 held by Galen Rupp. In the same month, Hocker won a national title in the 1500 m at the 2024 USA Indoor Track and Field Championships, setting a meeting record in 3:37.51. In March, he won a silver medal for the United States in the 1500 m at the 2024 World Athletics Indoor Championships in Glasgow, his first finish on the podium at a global competition. In May, Hocker achieved the Olympic qualifying standard in the 5000 m by running a personal best of 12:58.82 at the Los Angeles Grand Prix.

In the final of the 1500 m at the 2024 Olympic Trials, Hocker took the lead from Yared Nuguse in the final 250 meters to win in a meet record and personal best of 3:30.59. In doing so, the 23-year-old qualified for his second Olympic Games. At the 2024 Summer Olympics in Paris, on August 6, Hocker won the 1500 meter gold medal with a new Olympic record and North American area record of 3:27.65, almost 3 seconds better than his previous personal best, overcoming the favorites Josh Kerr, Jakob Ingebrigtsen, and Yared Nuguse. Hocker's time placed him then as the seventh fastest 1500 meter runner in history. The race was highly anticipated given Ingebrigtsen's rivalry with Kerr, with World Athletics President and former middle-distance runner Sebastian Coe labeling it a "race for the ages". Ingebrigtsen led at a fast pace for most of the race but was passed by Kerr in the final straightaway. Ingebrigtsen ended up moving outwards, giving Hocker, who is famous for his finishing kick, an opening on the inside to pass Ingebrigtsen and Kerr to win gold. Hocker's victory gave the United States their first gold medal in the event since 2016, when Matthew Centrowitz Jr. won at the 2016 Summer Olympics in Rio de Janeiro, Brazil. It was the first time since 1912 that two Americans finished on the podium, with Nuguse securing the bronze medal.

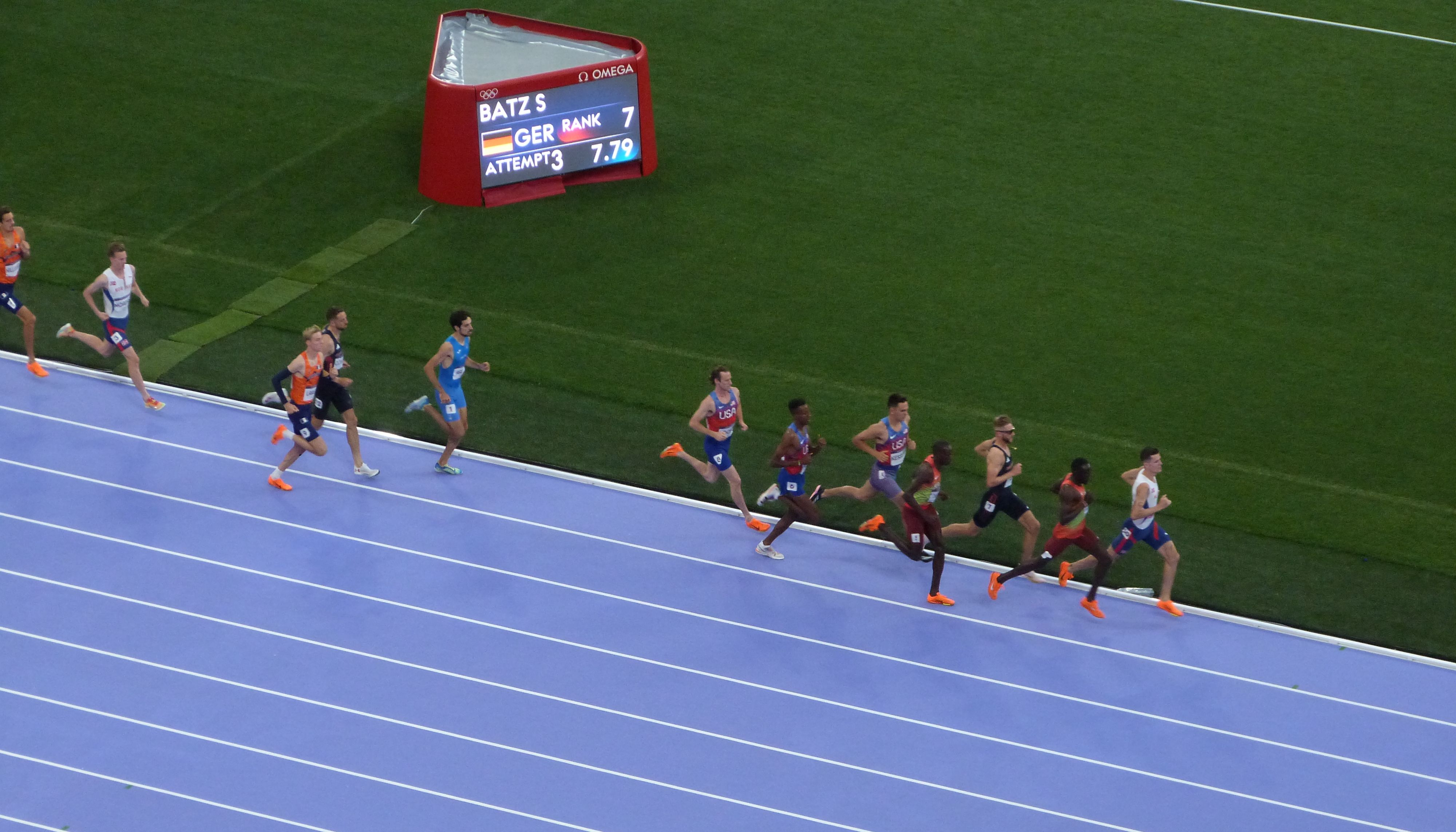
Hocker (7th position) competing in the 2024 Olympic 1500 meter final in Paris.

At the Lausanne Diamond League on August 22, Hocker finished second in the 1500 metres to Jakob Ingebrigtsen, in a time of 3:29.85 while Ingebrigtsen finished in a new meeting record of 3:27.83.

At the 2024 Weltklasse Zurich meeting on September 5, Hocker finished third in the 1500 metres, in a time of 3:30.46. That same month, it was announced that Hocker signed with Michael Johnson's Grand Slam Track league for the 2025 season, in the short distance (800 m / 1500 m) category.

=== 2025: 5000 meter world title ===
On February 8 at the Millrose Games, Hocker competed against Grant Fisher in the 3000 meters. Hocker made a move on Fisher with three laps to go, but was out-kicked by Fisher in the final straightaway. Fisher set a new world indoor record of 7:22.91, while Hocker secured the second fastest time at the distance with a personal best of 7:23.14.

On February 21, at the BU Terrier Meet in Boston, Hocker met the world standard in the 5000 meters, running 12:57.82, out-kicking Cooper Teare in the final straightaway, who ran 12:57.97.

During the 2025 Grand Slam Track season, Hocker competed in all three Slams in the short-distance event group. He finished fourth overall at Kingston, sixth overall at Miami, and fourth overall at Philadelphia. In the Miami Slam, Hocker set a new personal best over the 800 meter distance, with a time of 1:45.13. In the Philadelphia Slam, Hocker finished second to Josh Kerr in the 1500 meters, running 3:34.51, with Kerr 0.07 seconds ahead.

On June 15, Hocker finished seventh in the 5000 meters at the Stockholm Diamond League, in a time of 13:09.36. On July 5, Hocker finished fifth in the Bowerman Mile at the Prefontaine Classic, in a personal best time of 3:47.43.

On August 2, Hocker finished third behind Ethan Strand and Jonah Koech in the 1500 meter final at the 2025 USA Outdoor Track and Field Championships, thus securing his position for the 2025 World Championships in Tokyo, Japan. On August 3, he won the 5000 meter final over Nico Young and Grant Fisher, in a time of 13:26.45, closing in 51.76 for the final 400 meters.

At the 2025 World Championships, Hocker was disqualified in the semifinal round of the 1500 meters, due to a jostle with German athlete Robert Farken. He later won the 5000 meters in a time of 12:58.30, becoming the first American to win a world title over this distance since Bernard Lagat in 2007. His final lap was clocked at 52.5 seconds. With his 2024 Olympic title in the 1500 meters and his 2025 world title in the 5000 meters, Hocker is the fifth man after Paavo Nurmi, Hicham El Guerrouj, Jakob Ingebrigtsen, and Lagat to win a global title at both distances.

=== 2026: American record in the short track mile ===
On January 23, Hocker broke Bernard Lagat's American record of 4:54.74 in the short track 2000 meters, running 4:52.92. The following day, Hocker's record was broken by Hobbs Kessler, who set a new short track world record of 4:48.79 in the event. On February 1, at the Millrose Games, Hocker won the two mile distance over Josh Kerr, in a time of 8:07.31.

On February 14, Hocker broke Yared Nuguse's American record of 3:46.63 in the short track mile, running 3:45.94. Hocker's time stands as the second fastest in indoor history, behind only Jakob Ingebrigtsen's world record of 3:45.14. Hocker split 3:30.80 at 1500 meters en route to the mile, which also stands as a new American record.

== Achievements ==
All statistics from athlete's profile on World Athletics.

=== Personal bests ===
Surface	Event	Time	Date	Venue	Notes
Outdoor track	800 m	1:45.13	May 3, 2025	Ansin Sports Complex, Miami, United States	
Outdoor track	1500 m	3:27.65	August 6, 2024	Stade de France, Saint-Denis, France	OR, AR (Note: Hocker's time of 3:27.65 is currently an unratified North, Central American, and Caribbean area record, but is not the United States national record, which belongs to Bernard Lagat, who ran 3:27.40 in 2004. Lagat's time was ratified by the USATF in 2018, and Lagat ran the time a few months after becoming a naturalized American citizen, but a few weeks before representing Kenya at the 2004 Summer Olympics. While the USATF ratified Lagat's time, NACAC did not. Therefore, when ratified, Hocker's time will be the area record, while Lagat's time remains the national record.), 8th all time
Outdoor track	One mile	3:47.43	July 5, 2025	Hayward Field, Eugene, United States	17th all time
Outdoor track	3000 m	7:42.93	August 5, 2023	AtletiekArena Gaston Roelants Kessel-Lo / Hal 5, Leuven, Belgium	
Outdoor track	5000 m	12:58.30	September 21, 2025	World Athletics Championships, Tokyo, Japan	
Indoor track	800 m	1:48.44	February 13, 2021	Randal Tyson Indoor Center, Fayetteville, United States	
Indoor track	1500 m	3:30.80+	February 14, 2026	JDL Fast Track, Winston-Salem, North Carolina, United States	AR, 2nd all time
Indoor track	One mile	3:45.94	February 14, 2026	JDL Fast Track, Winston-Salem, North Carolina, United States	AR, 2nd all time
Indoor track	2000 m	4:52.92	January 23, 2026	Rector Fieldhouse, Blacksburg, Virginia, United States	8th all time
Indoor track	3000 m	7:23.14	February 8, 2025	Armory Track & Field Center, New York, United States	2nd all time
Indoor track	Two miles	8:05.70	February 11, 2024	Armory Track & Field Center, New York, United States	6th all time
Indoor track	5000 m	12:57.82	February 21, 2025	Boston University Track and Tennis Center, United States	15th all time
Road	One mile road (Note: Hocker ran 3:51.00 on the road at the 2022 New Balance 5th Avenue Mile on September 11, 2022, which is not listed on his World Athletics profile. Source)	4:08.0h	June 6, 2019	Indianapolis, United States	

=== International championships ===
Representing the United States
Year	Competition	Venue	Position	Event	Time
2021	Olympic Games	National Stadium, Tokyo, Japan	6th	1500 m	3:31.40
2023	World Championships	Nemzeti Atlétikai Központ, Budapest, Hungary	7th	1500 m	3:30.70
2024	World Indoor Championships	Commonwealth Arena, Glasgow, Scotland	2nd	1500 m	3:36.69
2024	Olympic Games	Stade de France, Paris, France	1st	1500 m	3:27.65 OR
2025	World Championships	National Stadium, Tokyo, Japan	DQ	1500 m	DQ
2025	World Championships	National Stadium, Tokyo, Japan	1st	5000 m	12:58.30

=== Circuit performances ===
Grand Slam Track results
Slam	Race group	Event	Pl.	Time	Prize money
2025 Kingston Slam	Short distance	1500 m	3rd	3:35.52	US$25,000
2025 Kingston Slam	Short distance	800 m	5th	1:48.02	US$25,000
2025 Miami Slam	Short distance	1500 m	3rd	3:34.79	US$15,000
2025 Miami Slam	Short distance	800 m	6th	1:45.13	US$15,000
2025 Philadelphia Slam	Short distance	800 m	6th	1:45.81	US$25,000
2025 Philadelphia Slam	Short distance	1500 m	2nd	3:34.51	US$25,000

=== National championships ===
Year	Competition	Venue	Position	Event	Notes
2021	US Olympic Trials	Hayward Field; Eugene, Oregon	1st	1500 m	3:35.28
2022	USA Indoor Track and Field Championships	The Podium; Spokane, Washington	1st	3000 m	7:47.50
2022	USA Indoor Track and Field Championships	The Podium; Spokane, Washington	1st	1500 m	3:39.09
2022	USA Outdoor Track and Field Championships	Hayward Field; Eugene, Oregon	H1 6th	1500 m	3:39.57
2023	USA Outdoor Track and Field Championships	Hayward Field; Eugene, Oregon	3rd	1500 m	3:35.46
2024	US Olympic Trials	Hayward Field; Eugene, Oregon	1st	1500 m	3:30.59
2024	US Olympic Trials	Hayward Field; Eugene, Oregon	7th	5000 m	13:20.99
2025	USA Outdoor Track and Field Championships	Hayward Field; Eugene, Oregon	3rd	1500 m	3:30.37
2025	USA Outdoor Track and Field Championships	Hayward Field; Eugene, Oregon	1st	5000 m	13:26.45
