= Cooper Teare =

American long-distance runner

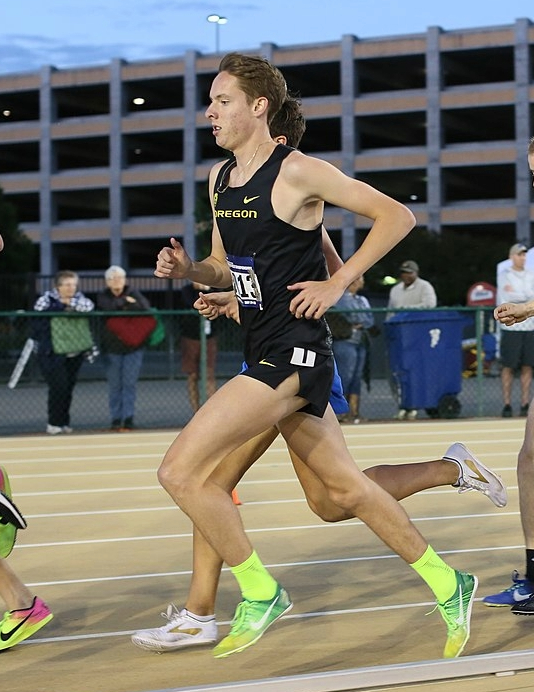
- Teare in 2018 competing in the NCAA

Personal information
- Full name: Cooper Teare
- Nationality: American
- Born: 18 August 1999 (age 26) Alameda, California
- Height: 6 ft 2 in (1.88 m)

Sport
- Country: United States
- Sport: Track and Field
- Events: 1500m, 3000m, 5000m
- University team: University of Oregon
- Club: Bowerman Track Club; 2022-23
- Turned pro: 2 December 2021
- Coached by: Ben Thomas 2017-2021; Jerry Schumacher 2022-23; Ben Thomas 2023-Present

Achievements and titles
- Personal bests: Outdoor; 800 m: 1:47.90 (Walnut 2022); 1500 m: 3:32.16 (Charlottesville 2024); Mile: 3:51.70 (Eugene 2022); 5000 m: 12:54.72 (Los Angeles 2024); Indoor; 800 m: 1:47.48i (Chicago 2022); Mile: 3:50.17i (Chicago 2022); 3000 m: 7:30.62i (New York 2025); 5000 m: 12:57.97i (Boston 2025)
Medal record
Men's track and field
Representing United States
NACAC Championships
Silver medal – second place	2025 Freeport	5000 m
Pan American Junior Championships
Bronze medal – third place	2017 Trujillo	1500 m

Cooper Teare (born August 18, 1999) is an American middle- and long-distance runner. He is a two-time national champion, securing victories in the 1500 metres at the 2022 USA Outdoor Track and Field Championships and in the 2024 USA Cross Country Championships. Teare has represented the United States at the 2022 World Athletics Championships, the 2018 IAAF World U20 Championships, and the 2017 Pan American U20 Athletics Championships, where he earned a bronze medal in the 1500 m.

As a high schooler in California, Teare won multiple state titles in cross country and track. He competed for the University of Oregon from 2017 to 2021, where he won the 5000 m at the 2021 NCAA Division I Outdoor Track and Field Championships in 13:12.27, a collegiate record. He also established a collegiate record in the indoor mile with a time of 3:50.39 and was part of a team that set the collegiate record in the indoor distance medley relay. Since 2021, Teare has been competing professionally for Nike.

== Early life and youth sports ==
Teare initially played soccer and lacrosse before turning to running, while growing up in Alameda, California. In an interview, he stated, "I chose to run because I played every other sport and I was always average but could never really excel at them and running always seemed to come naturally to me so I pursued it." His grandfather was a state champion in track during the 1950s. Teare started competing in elementary school and later ran for St. Joseph Notre Dame High School. During the summer before his junior year, he reported running 500 miles to prepare for cross country. He went on to win a state title in cross country and the 3200m, which he won in 8:51.85. He also clocked 4:00.16 in the mile at the Mt. SAC Relays, establishing him as the fifth fastest performer ever in a high school-only competition. For his achievements, Teare was named the 2016 East Bay Times Boys Track and Field Athlete of the Year.

== Collegiate competition ==
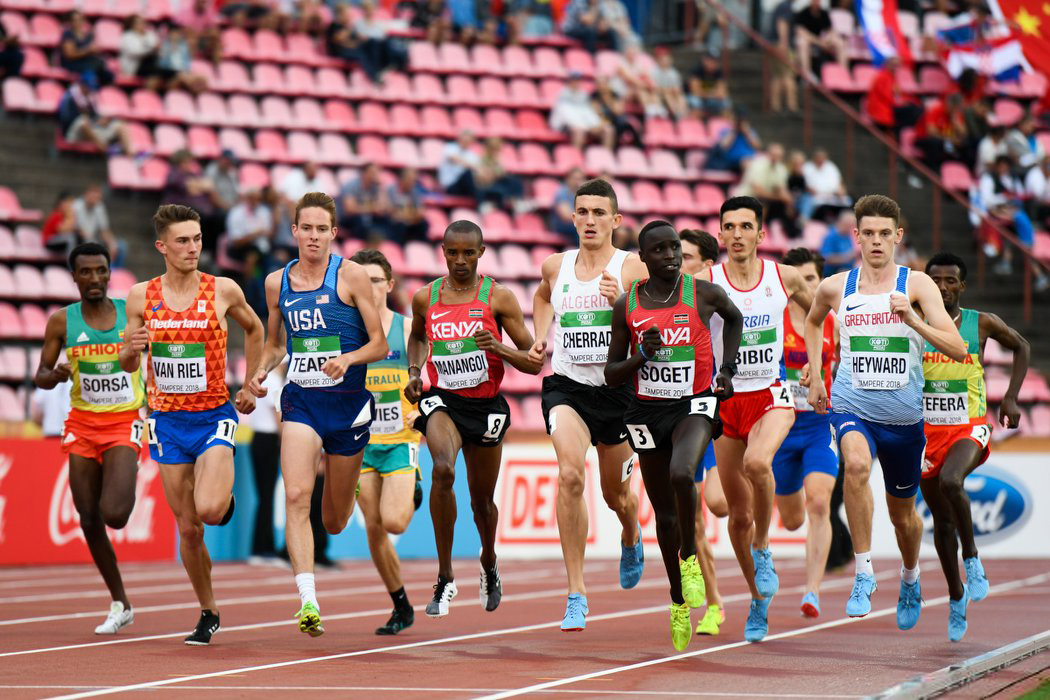
Teare (third from left) competes in the 1500 metres at the 2018 IAAF World U20 Championships in Tampere, Finland.

While competing for the University of Oregon, Teare set two collegiate records and won an NCAA title. His first collegiate record came in the indoor mile in February 2021, when he ran 3:50.39 to break Edward Cheserek's previous record of 3:52.01. His teammate, Cole Hocker, also eclipsed the previous record with a time of 3:50.55. Teare set another collegiate record and won a national title in the 5000 m at the 2021 NCAA Outdoor Track and Field Championships, finishing in 13:12.27. This performance qualified him in the event for the 2020 Olympic Trials, where he finished fourth, missing the top three required to advance to the Olympics.

Other accomplishments by Teare include his participation in a record-setting distance medley relay. As the anchor of the relay, he led his teammates to a time of 9:19.42, establishing a new world record for the indoor event. While a collegiate, Teare also represented the United States in the 1500 m and 5000 m at the 2018 IAAF World U20 Championships in Tampere, Finland. He finished 10th in both. He was a semi-finalist for The Bowerman in 2021, an award given for exceptional performance in college athletics.

== Senior competition ==
=== 2021-2022: 1500 National Champion ===
In December 2021, Teare announced his decision to forego his remaining eligibility in the NCAA and to compete professionally. On January 29, 2022, Teare made his professional debut at the Millrose Games, where he ran 7:39.61 in the 3000 m to finish second. The following month, he aimed to set a new American indoor mile record alongside his former teammate Cole Hocker. His time of 3:50.17 missed the American record by 0.19 seconds. The next day, he set another personal record in the 800 m with a time of 1:47.48. In March, Teare ran the 5000 m at the Cardinal Classic, setting a personal best of 13:06.73 and meeting the qualifying standard in the event for the World Athletics Championships.

In June 2022, Teare won the 1500 m at the 2022 USA Outdoor Track and Field Championships with a time of 3:45.86. It was Teare's first individual national title, and the performance qualified him for the 2022 World Championships, held in Eugene. At the World Championships, Teare did not advance past the preliminary rounds. Following the race, he reported that his training leading up to the event had been affected by injury.

=== 2023 - 2024: USA Cross Country Champion ===
In October 2023, Teare announced his decision to leave the Bowerman Track Club. In his first race since leaving the club, Teare won the 2024 USA Cross Country Championships 10k race in January 2024, qualifying him for the World Cross Country Championships. Later that month, Teare formally confirmed that he had relocated to Virginia to train with Cole Hocker under his former coach Ben Thomas. In May 2024, Teare broke the 13-minute 5,000 m barrier for the first time in his 12:54.72, ninth-place finish at the Los Angeles Grand Prix. With this performance, Teare became the fourth fastest American man ever in the event. At the U.S. Olympic Trials, Teare contested the 1500m and 5000m. While he advanced to the final of each, he was ultimately unsuccessful in securing an Olympic berth, placing 10th in the 1500m and 12th in the 5,000m.

=== 2025 ===
On February 21 at the BU Terrier Meet in Boston, Teare met the world standard in the indoor 5000 meters, running 12:57.97. He was out-kicked by training partner Cole Hocker, who won the race in 12:57.82.

== Achievements ==
All information from World Athletics profile.

=== Circuit performances ===
Grand Slam Track results
Slam	Race group	Event	Pl.	Time	Prize money
2025 Kingston Slam	Long distance	5000 m	2nd	14:39.31	US$30,000
2025 Kingston Slam	Long distance	3000 m	5th	8:04.16	US$30,000
2025 Miami Slam	Long distance	3000 m	4th	8:18.08	US$30,000
2025 Miami Slam	Long distance	5000 m	2nd	13:46.25	US$30,000

=== NCAA championships results ===
Year	Meet	Venue	Event	Place	Time
2017	NCAA Cross Country Championships	E. P. "Tom" Sawyer State Park	10k	44th	30:06.8
2018	NCAA Outdoor Track and Field Championships	Hayward Field	5000m	17th	14:08.18
2018	NCAA Cross Country Championships	Madison, WI	10k	94th	30:34.3
2019	NCAA Indoor Track and Field Championships	Randal Tyson Track Center	3000m	4th	7:55.50
2019	NCAA Indoor Track and Field Championships	Randal Tyson Track Center	DMR	9th	9:41.27
2019	NCAA Outdoor Track and Field Championships	Mike A. Myers Stadium	5000m	22nd	15:04.51
2019	NCAA Cross Country Championships	LaVern Gibson	10k	6th	30:49.2
2021	NCAA Indoor Track and Field Championships	Randal Tyson Track Center	3000m	2nd	7:46.23
2021	NCAA Indoor Track and Field Championships	Randal Tyson Track Center	DMR	1st	9:19.98
2021	NCAA Outdoor Track and Field Championships	Hayward Field	5000m	1st	13:12.27
2021	NCAA Cross Country Championships	Apalachee Regional Park	10k	247th	33:00.0

=== National championships results ===
Year	Competition	Venue	Position	Event	Notes
2021	US Olympic Trials	Hayward Field; Eugene, Oregon	4th	5,000 m	13:28.08
2022	USA Outdoor Track and Field Championships	Hayward Field; Eugene, Oregon	1st	1,500 m	3:45.86
2023	USA Outdoor Track and Field Championships	Hayward Field; Eugene, Oregon	H3 4th	1,500 m	3:39.38
2023	USA Outdoor Track and Field Championships	Hayward Field; Eugene, Oregon	5th	5,000 m	13:27.02
2024	US Olympic Trials	Hayward Field; Eugene, Oregon	10th	1,500 m	3:35.17
2024	US Olympic Trials	Hayward Field; Eugene, Oregon	12th	5,000 m	13:42.50
