= Josh Kerr =

Scottish runner, record mile holder (born 1997)

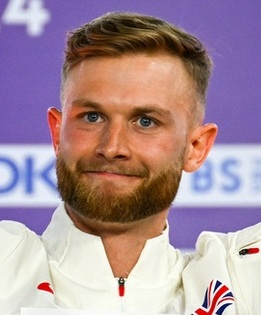
- Kerr at the 2024 World Athletics Indoor Championships

Personal information
- Born: 8 October 1997 (age 29) Edinburgh, Scotland
- Education: University of New Mexico
- Height: 6 ft 2 in (187 cm)
- Spouse: Larimar Rodriguez (m. 2025)

Sport
- Country: Great Britain & N.I. Scotland
- Sport: Athletics
- Events: 1500 metres, Mile
- College team: New Mexico Lobos
- Club: Brooks Beasts Track Club; Edinburgh AC
- Coached by: Danny Mackey (2018–); Joe Franklin (2015–2018); Mark Pollard (2015); David Campbell (–2015)

Achievements and titles
- Personal bests: Long track; 800 m: 1:44.60 (2026); 1500 m: 3:27.62+ (2026, NR); Mile: 3:42.66 (2026, WR); 5000 m: 13:23.78 (2021); Short track; 800 m: 1:46.64 i (2022); 1500 m: 3:32.86 i (2022); Mile: 3:48.87 i (2022); 3000 m: 7:30.14+ i (2024); 2 miles: 8:00.67 i (2024, WB)
Medal record
Men's athletics
Representing Great Britain
Olympic Games
Silver medal – second place	2024 Paris	1500 m
Bronze medal – third place	2020 Tokyo	1500 m
World Championships
Gold medal – first place	2023 Budapest	1500 m
World Ultimate Championship
First place	2026 Budapest	1500 m
World Indoor Championships
Gold medal – first place	2024 Glasgow	3000 m
Gold medal – first place	2026 Toruń	3000 m
European Junior Championships
Gold medal – first place	2015 Eskilstuna	1500 m
Representing Scotland
Commonwealth Games
Gold medal – first place	2026 Glasgow	One Mile

Josh Kerr (born 8 October 1997) is a Scottish middle-distance runner who has held the world record in the mile since 2026, with a time of 3:42.66. In the 1500 metres, Kerr won gold at the 2023 World Championships, silver at the 2024 Summer Olympics, and bronze at the 2020 Summer Olympics. In 2026 he won the inaugural World Athletics Ultimate Championship in the event. In the mile, he is the 2026 Commonwealth Games champion. In the 3000 metres, Kerr is the 2024 and 2026 world indoor champion. As a junior, Kerr won gold at the 2015 European Junior Championships.

Kerr competed for the University of New Mexico from 2015 to 2018, winning three NCAA titles. In April 2017, he set a collegiate record in the 1500 metres that stood until May 2021. He turned professional in 2018 and joined the Brooks Beasts Track Club. In 2023, Sportscotland named him Scottish Sportsperson of the Year.

== Early life and background ==
Kerr was born on 8 October 1997 in Edinburgh, Scotland. His mother works as a physiotherapist, and his father is a former rugby player. His older brother Jake is a professional rugby player. Kerr began running with the Edinburgh Athletics Club at the age of eight. He was educated at George Watson's College. At 16, he started reaching out to athletic coaches at colleges in the United States, aiming to compete in the National Collegiate Athletics Association (NCAA). Kerr stated that he received several negative responses from coaches, except for the coach at the University of New Mexico, who offered him a full athletics scholarship. In the summer before he started college, Kerr won gold in the 1500 m at the 2015 European Athletics Junior Championships. The following month, at age 17, he moved to Albuquerque and began competing for the University of New Mexico, majoring in exercise science.

== Collegiate competition ==
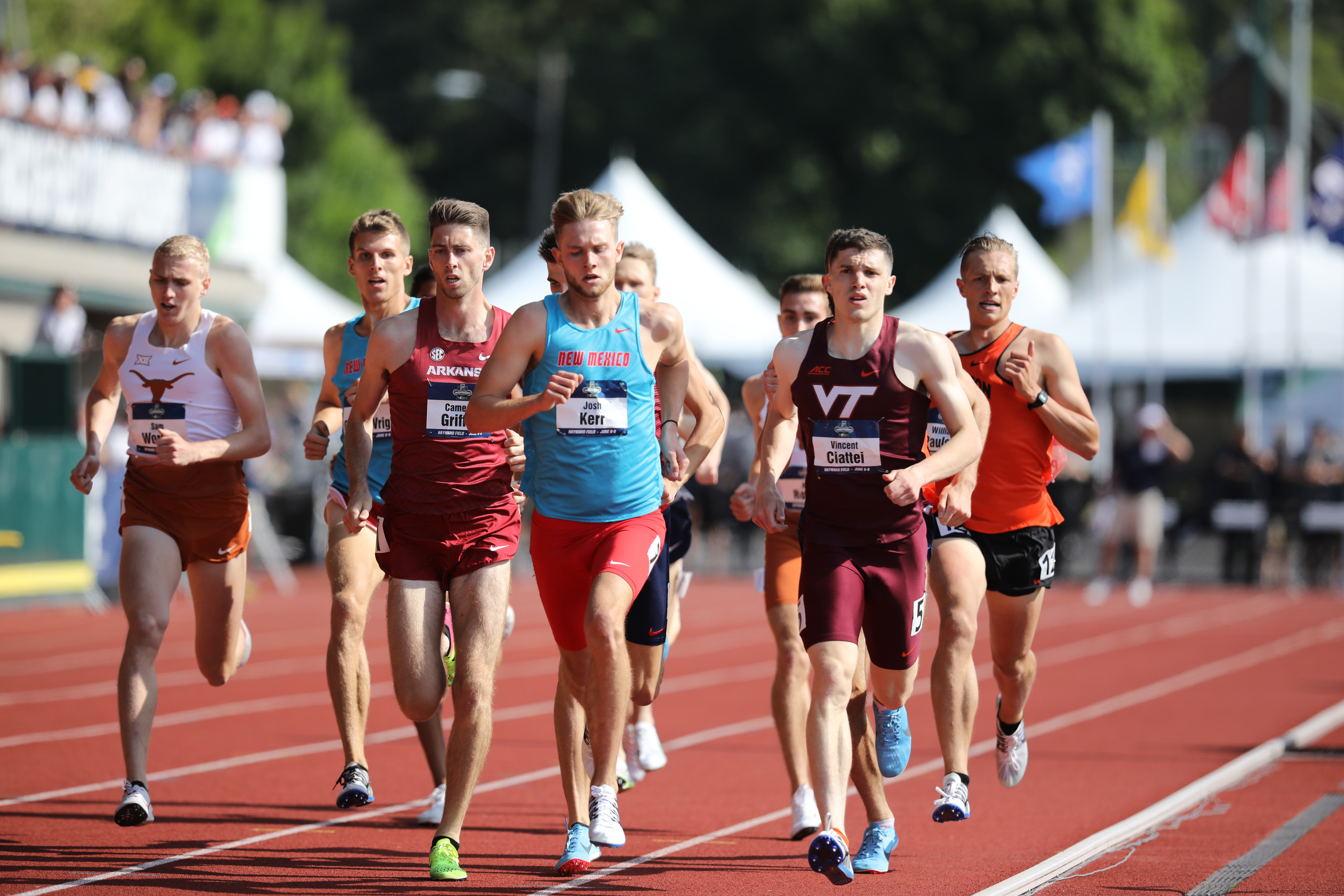
Kerr (centre) in the 1500 metres at the 2018 NCAA Division I Outdoor Track and Field Championships

While at the University of New Mexico, Kerr won three NCAA titles and set the collegiate record in the 1500 m. In March 2017, he won his first national title in the indoor mile, defeating Edward Cheserek, the collegiate record holder in the event and a 15-time NCAA champion. In June 2017, Kerr secured a second national title by winning the outdoor 1500 m, becoming the first man since Leo Manzano in 2008 to achieve both the indoor mile and the outdoor 1500 m titles in the same year. Kerr repeated his success in the indoor mile in March 2018, claiming another national title. On 20 April 2018, Kerr broke the collegiate record in the 1500 m with a time of 3:35.01, surpassing Sydney Maree's 1981 record of 3:35.30. This record stood for 3 years and 24 days, until it was broken by Yared Nuguse in May 2021. Kerr's final collegiate race was in June 2018, where he finished third in the 1500 m at the NCAA Championships.

== Professional competition ==
=== 2018–2020: Early professional career ===
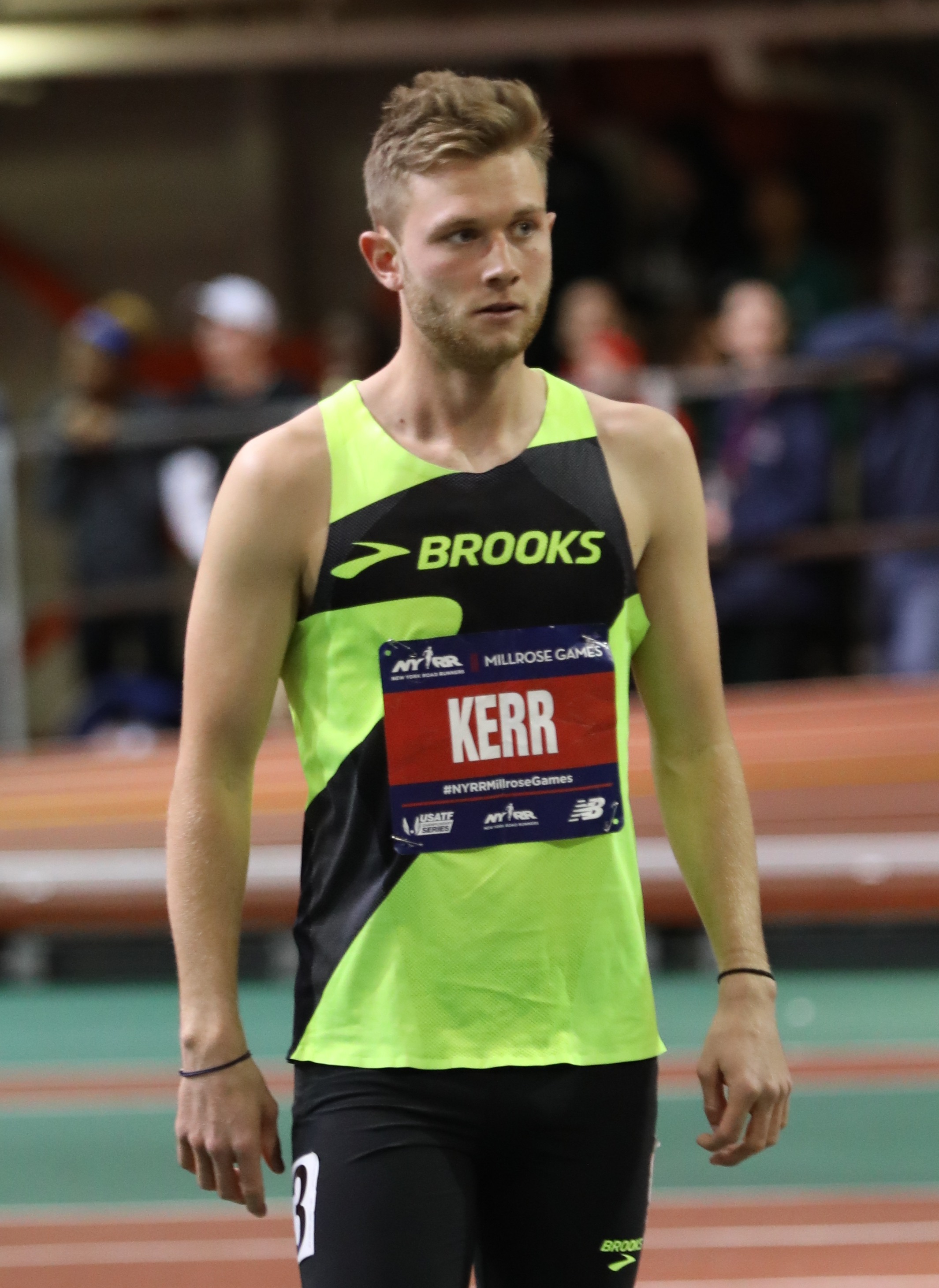
Kerr at the 2019 Millrose Games

Kerr turned professional in June 2018, forgoing his senior year of eligibility in the NCAA. He signed a sponsorship deal with Brooks Sports, a Seattle-based company, to train under coach Danny Mackey as part of the Brooks Beasts Track Club. He divided his training time between Seattle and Albuquerque. In August 2019, he participated in the 1500 m at the British Athletics Championships, where he won a silver medal, finishing behind Neil Gourley. This performance qualified him to represent Great Britain in the 1500 m at the 2019 World Championships later that month, where he placed sixth in the final.

=== 2021: Olympic 1500 m bronze ===
In May 2021, Kerr set a personal best of 1:45.74 in the 800 metres. The following month, he won his first national title in the 1500 m at the British Championships. This victory secured his spot to represent the British team at the 2020 Summer Olympics in Tokyo, which were rescheduled to 2021 due to the COVID-19 pandemic. At the Olympic 1500 m final, Kerr won a bronze medal in a personal best of 3:29.05, finishing behind Norway's Jakob Ingebrigtsen and Kenya's Timothy Cheruiyot.

=== 2022: European record in indoor mile ===
On 27 February 2022, Kerr ran 3:48.87 for the indoor mile at the Boston University Last Chance Meet. This performance broke Eamonn Coghlan's European indoor mile record, which had stood since 1983, and Peter Elliot's British indoor mile record from 1990. Additionally, Kerr's 1500 m split of 3:32.86 en route to the finish set a new British national record for the indoor 1500 m, surpassing Elliot's previous record. In July, he competed in the 1500 m at the 2022 World Athletics Championships in Eugene, Oregon. He finished in 5th place with a time of 3:30.60.

=== 2023: Gold medallist at World Championships ===
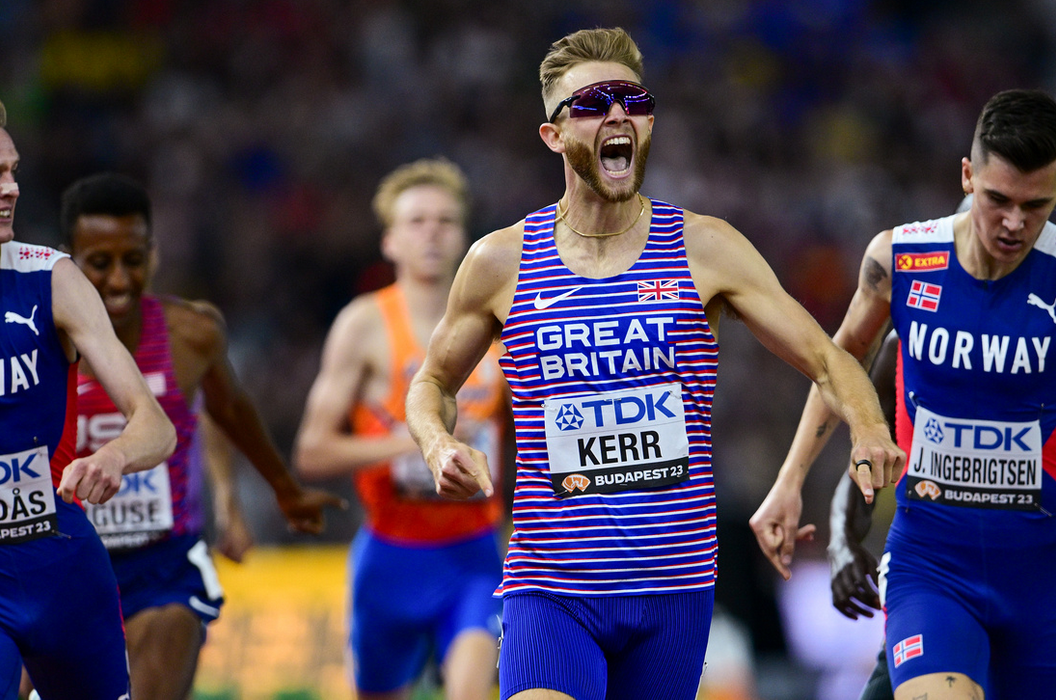
Kerr reacts after winning the 1500 metres at the 2023 World Athletics Championship

On 23 August 2023, Kerr claimed his first major title by winning the men's 1500 metres at the 2023 World Athletics Championships in a time of 3:29.38, overcoming Norwegian favourite Jakob Ingebrigtsen in the final when he prevailed in a sprint to the finish line.

It was the second successive World Championships where Ingebrigtsen was upset in the men's 1500 m final by an athlete from Edinburgh Athletics Club, following teammate and compatriot Jake Wightman's victory in Eugene in 2022.

Later that month, on 31 August 2023, Kerr competed in the Diamond League Final for the 1500 m, aiming to break the British record. He finished second to Yared Nuguse in a time of 3:30.51. This mark was 1.7 seconds off the national record.

In his final race of the season on 10 September 2023, Kerr won the New Balance 5th Avenue Mile, clocking a time of 3:47.9. He ended the year ranked third in the World Athletics Rankings for the 1500 m, behind Ingebrigtsen and Nuguse. He was named Scottish sportsperson of the Year in 2023 by Sportscotland.

=== 2024: World best, world indoor champion, Olympic 1500 m silver ===
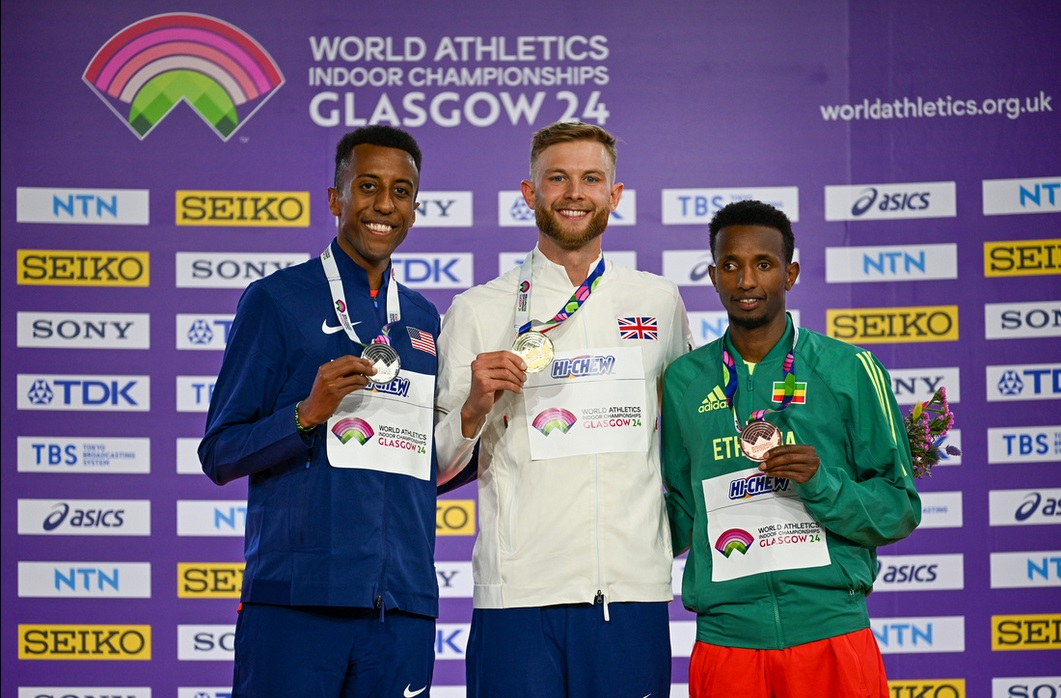
Kerr (centre) after winning the men's 3000 m at the 2024 World Athletics Indoor Championships in Glasgow, Scotland

In his first race of the year on 11 February, Kerr set a world best in the short track 2 mile at the Millrose Games. (Note: Kerr's time in the indoor 2-mile is recognized as a world best rather than an official world record by World Athletics, the international governing body for athletics. See best performances in non-WA World Record events.) His time of 8:00.67 surpassed the previous world best of 8:03.40 held by Mo Farah since 2015.

On 2 March, Kerr ran 7:42.98 for 3000 metres to claim gold at the World Athletics Indoor Championships in Glasgow.

On 20 April, Kerr opened his outdoor season in the Pro Men's 800 m Challenge at the Oregon Relays, winning in a time of 1:45.94. On 25 May, at the Prefontaine Classic, Kerr won the Bowerman Mile in a new British record time of 3:45.34, ahead of Jakob Ingebrigtsen (3:45.60) and Yared Nuguse (3:46.22). This eclipsed Steve Cram's previous British record of 3:46.32 by almost a full second. The race was a highly anticipated rematch between Kerr and Ingebrigtsen, and as such was billed as the "Mile of the Century." This performance ranked Kerr as the sixth fastest miler in history.

At the 2024 British Athletics Championships in late June, Kerr chose to compete in the 800 m. In the final, Kerr finished in last after colliding with Elliot Giles on the home straight. Just days earlier it was announced that he had signed up for the inaugural season of the Michael Johnson founded Grand Slam Track in 2025.

On 5 July, Kerr was selected to race in 1500 metres at the 2024 Summer Olympics. Just before the athletics events got underway, he was also named as the Great Britain athletics team captain for the Games in Paris. The final at these Games was anticipated because of Kerr's rivalry with fellow European middle-distance runner Jakob Ingebrigtsen.

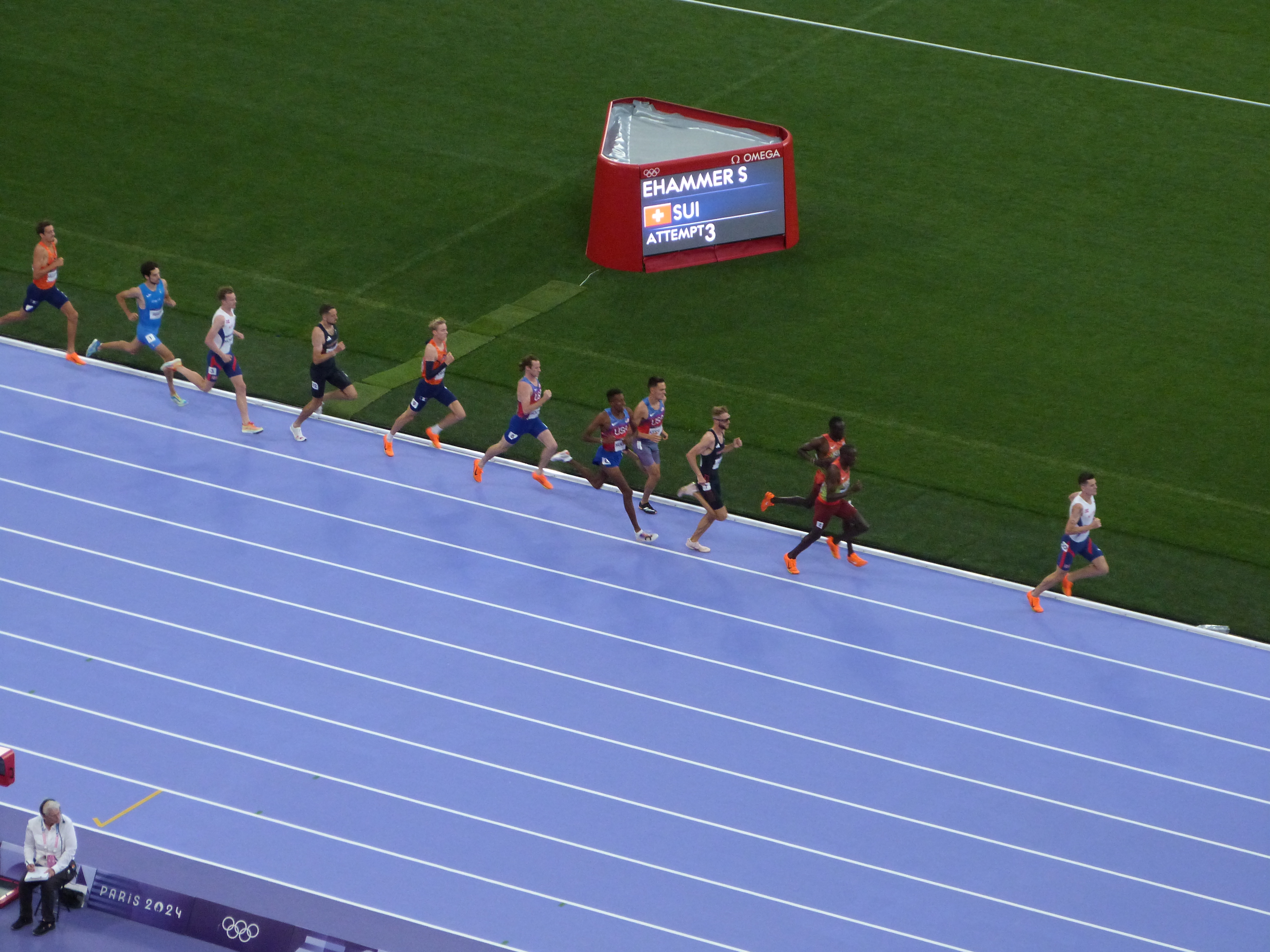
1500 m final in Paris; Kerr pictured in fourth position

On 6 August, in the Olympic men's 1500 metre final, Kerr unexpectedly finished second to Cole Hocker of the United States in a sprint finish. Kerr nearly got caught at the finish line by American Yared Nuguse who finished third, while Jakob Ingebrigtsen uncharacteristically finished fourth and had led for nearly the entire race at a fast pace. In the final stretch, Ingebrigtsen was initially leading, and was passed by Kerr, while behind the two was Hocker. However, when he had room, Hocker passed Ingebrigtsen and Kerr to win the race in a new Olympic record and North American area record of 3:27.65. Kerr's time to secure the silver medal was a new personal best and new British national record of 3:27.79, breaking Mo Farah's previous British record of 3:28.81 by over a second. Nuguse was one hundredth of a second behind Kerr in a new personal best of 3:27.80, while Ingebrigtsen finished in 3:28.24.

On 8 September, Kerr won the Fifth Avenue Mile in New York City, running a new course record of 3:44.3. This eclipsed Sydney Maree's previous record of 3:47.52 by more than three seconds, which had stood for 43 years, since the inaugural edition of the race in 1981. Kerr had previously won the race in 2023 as well, in a time of 3:47.9.

In October, Kerr was named Scottish Athletics' athlete of the year.

=== 2025: British 5000 m champion ===
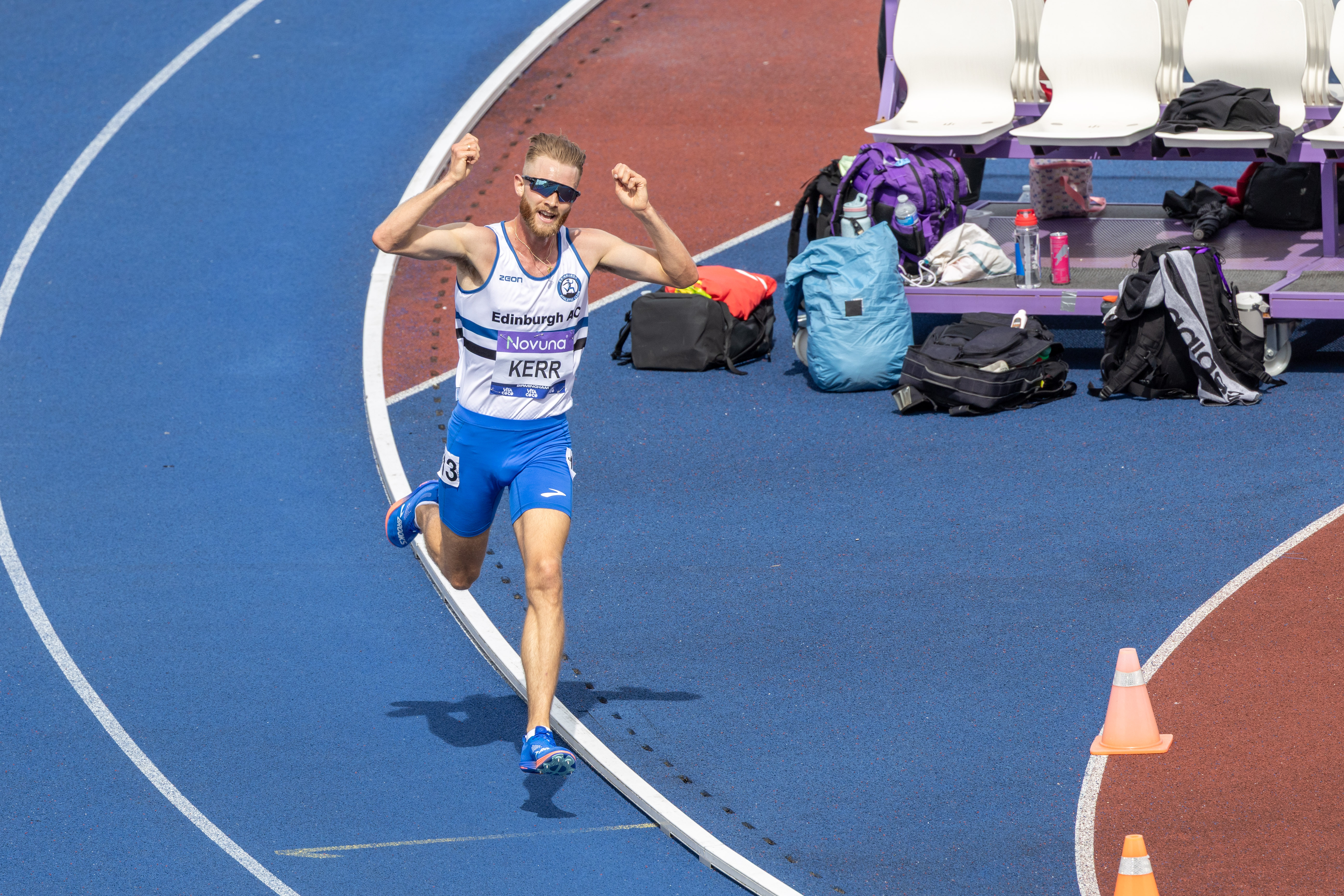
Kerr en route to winning gold in the 5000 m at the 2025 UK Championships.

In February, Kerr intended to compete in the Wanamaker Mile at the Millrose Games, but dropped out due to illness. In April, he finished seventh overall in the Short Distance event group at the 2025 Kingston Slam. In May, at the 2025 Miami Slam, with 16 points earned, Kerr was crowned Slam Champion of the Short Distance event group, having won the 1500 metres, and having finished fifth in the 800 metres, in a new personal best of 1:45.01.

In July, Kerr finished second to Phanuel Koech in the 1500 metres at the London Athletics Meet. In August, he became the British 5000 metres champion after winning the title at the 2025 UK Athletics Championships.

In September, at the 2025 World Athletics Championships, Kerr sustained a right calf injury in the final of the 1500 metres.

=== 2026: Mile world record ===
In March, at the 2026 World Athletics Indoor Championships held in Toruń in Poland, Kerr won the world indoor 3000 metres title for the second time. That same month, Kerr announced that he would make an attempt at the world record in the mile race at the London Diamond League meet in July later that year. At the time, Kerr stated, "It needs to be a legal attempt, not a time trial. That was number one. Second, it needs to be in the UK. And third, I wanted to commit my season around it because this isn't a record that you can steal." Prior to the record attempt, Kerr raced in only two 800 m races in the following months, focusing on training for his record attempt. For five weeks prior to the record attempt, he had been training at altitude in Albuquerque, at 1,626 metres (5,335 ft) of elevation. In the build-up to his world record attempt, Kerr completed a 1200 m time trial in 2:42.45.

On 18 July, Kerr broke Hicham El Guerrouj's mile world record of 3:43.13 at the London Diamond League, clocking 3:42.66, 2.68 seconds faster than his prior personal best. El Guerrouj had set the previous record in 1999, and the 27-year period between world records was the longest in the men's mile run world record progression. Kerr called his attempt "Project 222", referring to running a mile in 222 seconds or 3 minutes and 42 seconds. He used a custom, World Athletics–compliant pair of spikes and a speed suit during the record attempt. Kerr was assisted by two pacemakers in the attempt, Brannon Kidder through 800 m and Žan Rudolf through 1000 m. Kidder had trained extensively with Kerr before the attempt and was a teammate with him in the Brooks Beasts Track Club, whereas Rudolf filled in after a previously planned pacemaker withdrew, and had one day of training with Kerr before the race. World Athletics awarded Kerr US$50,000 (approximately £37,000) for the world record performance, the same amount that El Guerrouj received in 1999, to which Kerr said, "It was a good day for me financially but $50,000 is a ridiculous number. To get the same amount 27 years later is appalling, not to sound greedy." En route to the world record, Kerr ran a new British national record of 3:27.62 for his 1500 m split.

At the Commonwealth Games held in Glasgow, Kerr won gold in the mile. In a slow and tactical race, Kerr was able to pull away from second-placed Cameron Myers and Scottish compatriot Jake Wightman over the final 200 m to secure the gold medal in front of a home Scottish crowd. Following the race, Kerr stated "It means everything, this was the championships of my season, this was the one that we had circled on the calendar. I owed the British crowd that."

In the lead-up to the World Athletics Ultimate Championships in Budapest, Kerr completed a 1000 metre time trial in 2:12.66, which is 0.83 seconds slower than the current world record of 2:11.83 set by Emmanuel Wanyonyi. Kerr won the 1500 metres at the World Athletics Ultimate Championships over Cameron Myers, in a time of 3:29.35.

== Personal life ==
Kerr and his wife Larimar reside in Albuquerque, New Mexico. He enjoys listening to audiobook podcasts.

Kerr's team includes a personal chef, nutritionist, physiotherapist, chiropractor, and strength and conditioning experts.

== Achievements ==
Information taken from World Athletics profile.

=== Circuit performances ===
Grand Slam Track results
Slam	Race group	Event	Pl.	Time	Prize money
2025 Kingston Slam	Short distance	1500 m	5th	3:35.61	US$12,500
2025 Kingston Slam	Short distance	800 m	8th	1:50.68	US$12,500
2025 Miami Slam	Short distance	1500 m	1st	3:34.51	US$100,000
2025 Miami Slam	Short distance	800 m	5th	1:45.01	US$100,000
2025 Philadelphia Slam	Short distance	800 m	5th	1:45.80	US$50,000
2025 Philadelphia Slam	Short distance	1500 m	1st	3:34.44	US$50,000

=== International competitions ===
Representing Great Britain & Scotland
Year	Competition	Venue	Position	Event	Result	Team
2015	European Junior Championships	Eskilstuna, Sweden	1st	1500 m	3:49.62	Great Britain
2016	World U20 Championships	Bydgoszcz, Poland	10th	1500 m	3:51.23	Great Britain
2016	European Cross Country Championships	Chia, Italy	14th	Junior race	17:38	Great Britain
2017	World Championships	London, United Kingdom	34th (h)	1500 m	3:47.30	Great Britain & N.I.
2019	World Championships	Doha, Qatar	6th	1500 m	3:32.52	Great Britain & N.I.
2021	Olympic Games	Tokyo, Japan	3rd	1500 m	3:29.05	Great Britain
2022	World Championships	Eugene, United States	5th	1500 m	3:30.60	Great Britain & N.I.
2022	Commonwealth Games	Birmingham, United Kingdom	12th	1500 m	3:35.72	Scotland
2023	World Championships	Budapest, Hungary	1st	1500 m	3:29.38	Great Britain & N.I.
2024	World Indoor Championships	Glasgow, Scotland	1st	3000 m	7:42.98	Great Britain
2024	Olympic Games	Paris, France	2nd	1500 m	3:27.79	Great Britain
2025	World Championships	Tokyo, Japan	14th	1500 m	4:11.23	Great Britain
2026	World Indoor Championships	Toruń, Poland	1st	3000 m	7:35.56	Great Britain
2026	Commonwealth Games	Glasgow, United Kingdom	1st	Mile	3:54.12	Scotland
2026	Ultimate Championship	Budapest, Hungary	1st	1500 m	3:29.35	Great Britain

=== Personal bests ===
Category	Event	Time	Venue	Date	Notes
Outdoor	800 m	1:44.60	Los Angeles	23 May 2026	
Outdoor	1000 m	2:17.60	Finn Rock	17 July 2020	
Outdoor	1500 m	3:27.62+	London	18 July 2026	British Record
Outdoor	Mile	3:42.66	London	18 July 2026	World Record
Outdoor	3000 m	8:35.15	Bedford	31 August 2014	
Outdoor	5000 m	13:23.78	Irvine	15 May 2021	
Indoor	800 m	1:46.64	Spokane	11 February 2022	
Indoor	1500 m	3:32.86+	Boston	27 February 2022	
Indoor	Mile	3:48.87	Boston	27 February 2022	Scottish Record
Indoor	3000 m	7:30.14+	New York City	11 February 2024	Scottish Record
Indoor	Two Miles	8:00.67	New York City	11 February 2024	World Best

=== Honours ===
- Laureus World Sports Award for Breakthrough of the Year Nominee: 2024
