= Athletics at the 2024 Summer Olympics – Men's 1500 metres =

Men's 1500 metres at the Games of the XXXIII Olympiad
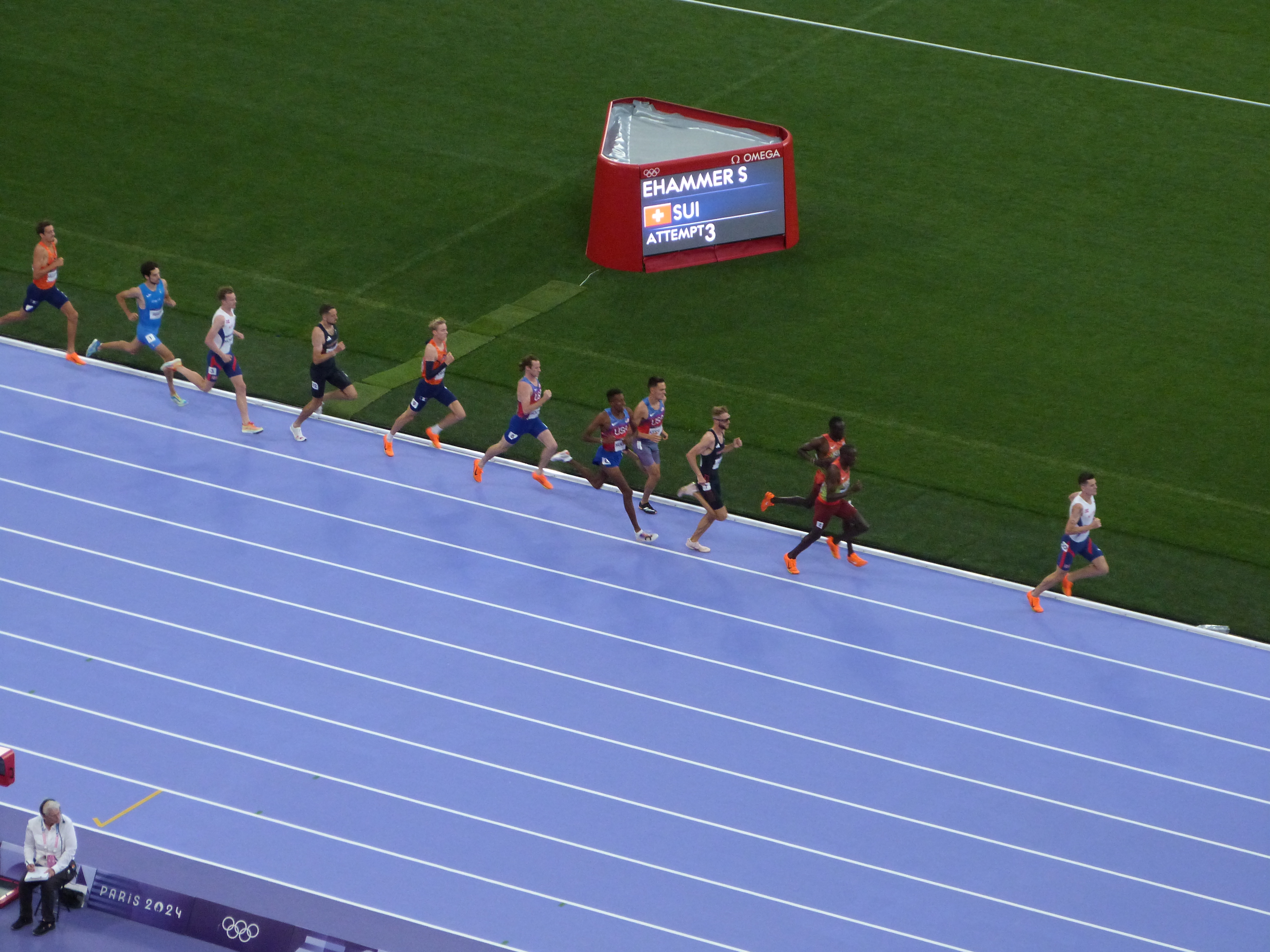
- Venue: Stade de France, Paris, France
- Dates: 2 August 2024 (heats); 3 August 2024 (repechage round); 4 August 2024 (semi-finals); 6 August 2024 (final)
- Winning time: 3:27.65 OR

Medalists
1st place, gold medalist(s)		Cole Hocker	United States
2nd place, silver medalist(s)		Josh Kerr	Great Britain
3rd place, bronze medalist(s)		Yared Nuguse	United States

The men's 1500 metres at the 2024 Summer Olympics was held in four rounds at the Stade de France in Paris, France, between 2 and 6 August 2024. This was the 30th time that the men's 1500 metres was contested at the Summer Olympics. A total of 45 athletes were able to qualify for the event by entry standard or ranking.

== Summary ==
Given the rivalry between Norway's reigning Olympic 1500-metre champion, and World 5000-metre champion, Jakob Ingebrigtsen and Great Britain's World 1500-metre champion, and World indoor 3000-metre champion, Josh Kerr; the men's 1500 metres at the 2024 Summer Olympics had been billed as a "Race for the Ages" by World Athletics President Sebastian Coe. Other potential challengers for medals according to World Athletics included: 2019 World Champion Timothy Cheruiyot, the USA's Yared Nuguse and France's Azeddine Habz.

Ingebrigtsen came into the Games as the world leader, his 3:26.73 came close to Hicham El Guerrouj's 26 year old world record of 3:26.00. Other athletes who had clocked times among the fastest in 2024 at the time of the Games included Cheruiyot, Brian Komen, Nuguse, Cole Hocker and Neil Gourley.

Ingebrigtsen had won the Olympic title three years earlier and his confidence and high expectations had affected his race strategy in recent years. At the 2022 World Championships, Great Britain's Jake Wightman, sprinted around him in the last 200 metres to take the World gold. Wightman was unable to compete at the Olympics due to injury. The following year, at the 2023 World Championships, Kerr - a clubmate of Wightman since their childhoods, repeated almost exactly the Wightman tactic, attacking at 200 metres to go and sprinting around to take the gold.

In the final, from the gun, Ingebrigtsen ran around the outside to take the lead as the field entered the first turn. Many athletes followed with Komen, Kerr and Cheruiyot going through 200 m in second to fourth, respectively. Ingebrigtsen led through 400 m with a split of 54.9 being one of the fastest splits in history for that stage of a Championship final. Ingebrigtsen remained in the lead, going through 800 m in 1:51.5, Komen, Kerr and Cheruiyot retained the positions behind.

With one lap to go, Ingebrigtsen went through in 2:33.5 with Cheruiyot moving to second (2:33.7) with Kerr in third (2:33.8) and Nuguse fourth (2:34.1). As Ingebrigtsen continued to push the pace at the front, Kerr passed Cheruiyot into second position at 1300 m. Hocker also moved further up the field, passing Nuguse and Cheruiyot to be in third position at 1400 m. Entering the final 100 m, Kerr moved up onto Ingebrigtsen's shoulder as Ingebrigtsen drifted out to the edge of lane one, meaning Kerr would be forced run farther. As a gap had opened up on the inside of lane one, Hocker attempted to pass through it but was blocked by Ingebrigtsen, who had moved back towards the inside of lane one. As they entered the home stretch, the expected duel between Kerr and Ingebrigtsen appeared to come to fruition.

Kerr began to pass Ingebrigtsen with approximately 75 m left, but in doing so, he again opened a gap on the inside of lane one which Hocker could pass through. Ingebrigtsen began to fade and a head-to-head between Hocker and Kerr formed, but Hocker was able to pass Kerr 20 meters before the finish to take gold. As Kerr's slowed towards the line, Nuguse gained on him, coming within 0.01 of passing him on the line for silver. Nuguse was rewarded with the bronze, with Ingebrigtsen finishing fourth and Hobbs Kessler finishing fifth in a new personal best.

With Hocker's gold and Nuguse's bronze, the 2024 1500 meter final was the first time in 112 years that two Americans made it on the Olympic podium in the event. The result edged the United States just ahead of Great Britain on the all-time medal table for the event. Hocker's finishing time of 3:27.65 was a new North American record and moved him to seventh on the all-time toplist at the time. Kerr set a British record of 3:27.79 in second, putting him eighth all time and Nuguse went ninth all time with his personal best of 3:27.80. Niels Laros set a Dutch national record of 3:29.54 in sixth and Pietro Arese set an Italian national record of 3:30.74 to finish eighth.

== Background ==
The men's 1500 metres has been present on the Olympic athletics programme since the inaugural edition in 1896.

Global records before the 2024 Summer Olympics
Record	Athlete (nation)	Time (s)	Location	Date
World record	Hicham El Guerrouj (MAR)	3:26.00	Rome, Italy	14 July 1998
Olympic record	Jakob Ingebrigtsen (NOR)	3:28.32	Tokyo, Japan	7 August 2021
World leading	Jakob Ingebrigtsen (NOR)	3:26.73	Fontvieille, Monaco	12 July 2024

Area records before the 2024 Summer Olympics
Area record	Athlete (nation)	Time (s)
Africa (records)	Hicham El Guerrouj (MAR)	3:26.00 WR
Asia (records)	Rashid Ramzi (BHR)	3:29.14
Europe (records)	Jakob Ingebrigtsen (NOR)	3:26.73
North, Central America and Caribbean (records)	Yared Nuguse (USA)	3:29.02
Oceania (records)	Oliver Hoare (AUS)	3:29.41
South America (records)	Hudson de Souza (BRA)	3:33.25

== Qualification ==
For the men's 1500 metres event, the qualification period was between 1 July 2023 and 30 June 2024. 45 athletes were able to qualify for the event, with a maximum of three athletes per nation, by running the entry standard of 3:33.50 seconds or faster or by their World Athletics Ranking for this event.

== Results ==
=== Heats ===
The heats were held on 2 August, starting at 11:05 (UTC+2) in the morning. The first 6 in each heat (Q) advanced to the semi-final, while all others (Re) advanced to the repechage round (except DNS, DNF, DQ).

==== Heat 1 ====
Rank	Athlete	Nation	Time	Notes
1	Josh Kerr	Great Britain	3:35.83	Q, SB
2	Brian Komen	Kenya	3:36.31	Q
3	Narve Gilje Nordås	Norway	3:36.41	Q
4	Anass Essayi	Morocco	3:36.44	Q
5	Yared Nuguse	United States	3:36.56	Q
6	Robert Farken	Germany	3:36.62	Q
7	Jochem Vermeulen	Belgium	3:36.66	
8	Samuel Pihlström	Sweden	3:36.80	
9	Cathal Doyle	Ireland	3:37.82	
10	Mario García	Spain	3:37.90	
11	Filip Rak	Poland	3:38.12	
12	Ryan Mphahlele	South Africa	3:38.48	
13	Oliver Hoare	Australia	3:39.11	
14	Abdisa Fayisa	Ethiopia	3:39.67	
15	Ossama Meslek	Italy	3:39.96	

==== Heat 2 ====
Rank	Athlete	Nation	Time	Notes
1	Ermias Girma	Ethiopia	3:35.21	Q
2	Cole Hocker	United States	3:35.27	Q
3	Pietro Arese	Italy	3:35.30	Q
4	Niels Laros	Netherlands	3:35.38	Q, SB
5	Timothy Cheruiyot	Kenya	3:35.39	Q
6	Isaac Nader	Portugal	3:35.44	Q
7	Marius Probst	Germany	3:35.65	
8	Luke McCann	Ireland	3:35.73	
9	Adel Mechaal	Spain	3:35.81	
10	George Mills	Great Britain	3:35.99	
11	Stewart Mcsweyn	Australia	3:36.55	
12	Ruben Verheyden	Belgium	3:36.62	
13	Tshepo Tshite	South Africa	3:36.87	
14	Charles Philibert-Thiboutot	Canada	3:36.92	
15	Maël Gouyette	France	3:37.87	

==== Heat 3 ====
Rank	Athlete	Nation	Time	Notes
1	Stefan Nillessen	Netherlands	3:36.77	Q
2	Hobbs Kessler	United States	3:36.87	Q
3	Jakob Ingebrigtsen	Norway	3:37.04	Q
4	Reynold Kipkorir Cheruiyot	Kenya	3:37.12	Q
5	Neil Gourley	Great Britain	3:37.18	Q
6	Samuel Tefera	Ethiopia	3:37.34	Q
7	Ignacio Fontes	Spain	3:37.50	
8	Adam Spencer	Australia	3:37.68	
9	Azeddine Habz	France	3:37.95	
10	Kieran Lumb	Canada	3:38.11	
11	Raphael Pallitsch	Austria	3:38.20	
12	Maciej Wyderka	Poland	3:38.79	
13	Sam Tanner	New Zealand	3:39.87	
14	Federico Riva	Italy	3:41.78	
15	Andrew Coscoran	Ireland	3:42.07	

=== Repechage round ===
The repechage round was held on 3 August, and started at 19:05 (UTC+2) in the evening. The first 3 in each Repechage heat (Q) advanced to the semi-final, while all others were eliminated.

==== Heat 1 ====
Rank	Athlete	Nation	Time	Notes
1	Cathal Doyle	Ireland	3:34.92	Q
2	Azeddine Habz	France	3:35.10	Q
3	Ossama Meslek	Italy	3:35.32	Q
4	Tshepo Tshite	South Africa	3:35.35	
5	Kieran Lumb	Canada	3:35.76	
6	Jochem Vermeulen	Belgium	3:36.14	
7	Luke McCann	Ireland	3:36.50	
8	Marius Probst	Germany	3:36.54	
9	Maciej Wyderka	Poland	3:36.79	
10	Abdisa Fayisa	Ethiopia	3:36.82	
11	Mario García	Spain	3:37.01	
12	Stewart Mcsweyn	Australia	3:37.49	
13	Raphael Pallitsch	Austria	3:39.32	

==== Heat 2 ====
Rank	Athlete	Nation	Time	Notes
1	Federico Riva	Italy	3:32.84	Q, PB
2	Charles Philibert-Thiboutot	Canada	3:33.53	Q, SB
3	George Mills	Great Britain	3:33.56	Q
4	Samuel Pihlström	Sweden	3:33.58	PB
5	Oliver Hoare	Australia	3:34.00	
6	Adam Spencer	Australia	3:34.45	SB
7	Filip Rak	Poland	3:34.53	
8	Ignacio Fontes	Spain	3:35.04	
9	Maël Gouyette	France	3:35.42	
10	Ruben Verheyden	Belgium	3:36.06	
11	Ryan Mphahlele	South Africa	3:36.64	
12	Andrew Coscoran	Ireland	3:39.45	
13	Sam Tanner	New Zealand	3:40.71	
14	Adel Mechaal	Spain	3:42.79	

=== Semi-finals ===
The semi-finals were held on 4 August, and started at 21:15 (UTC+2) in the evening. The first 6 in each heat (Q) advanced to the final.

==== Heat 1 ====
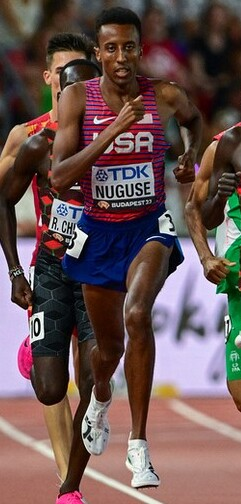
Yared Nuguse, the 2024 bronze medalist, pictured at the 2023 World Championships.

Rank	Athlete	Nation	Time	Notes
1	Yared Nuguse	United States	3:31.72	Q
2	Hobbs Kessler	United States	3:31.97	Q
3	Neil Gourley	Great Britain	3:32.11	Q
4	Niels Laros	Netherlands	3:32.22	Q
5	Timothy Cheruiyot	Kenya	3:32.30	Q
6	Narve Gilje Nordås	Norway	3:32.34	Q
7	Anass Essayi	Morocco	3:32.49	PB
8	Ossama Meslek	Italy	3:32.77	PB
9	Samuel Tefera	Ethiopia	3:33.02	
10	Cathal Doyle	Ireland	3:33.15	PB
11	Charles Philibert-Thiboutot	Canada	3:33.29	
12	Azeddine Habz	France	3:34.35	

==== Heat 2 ====
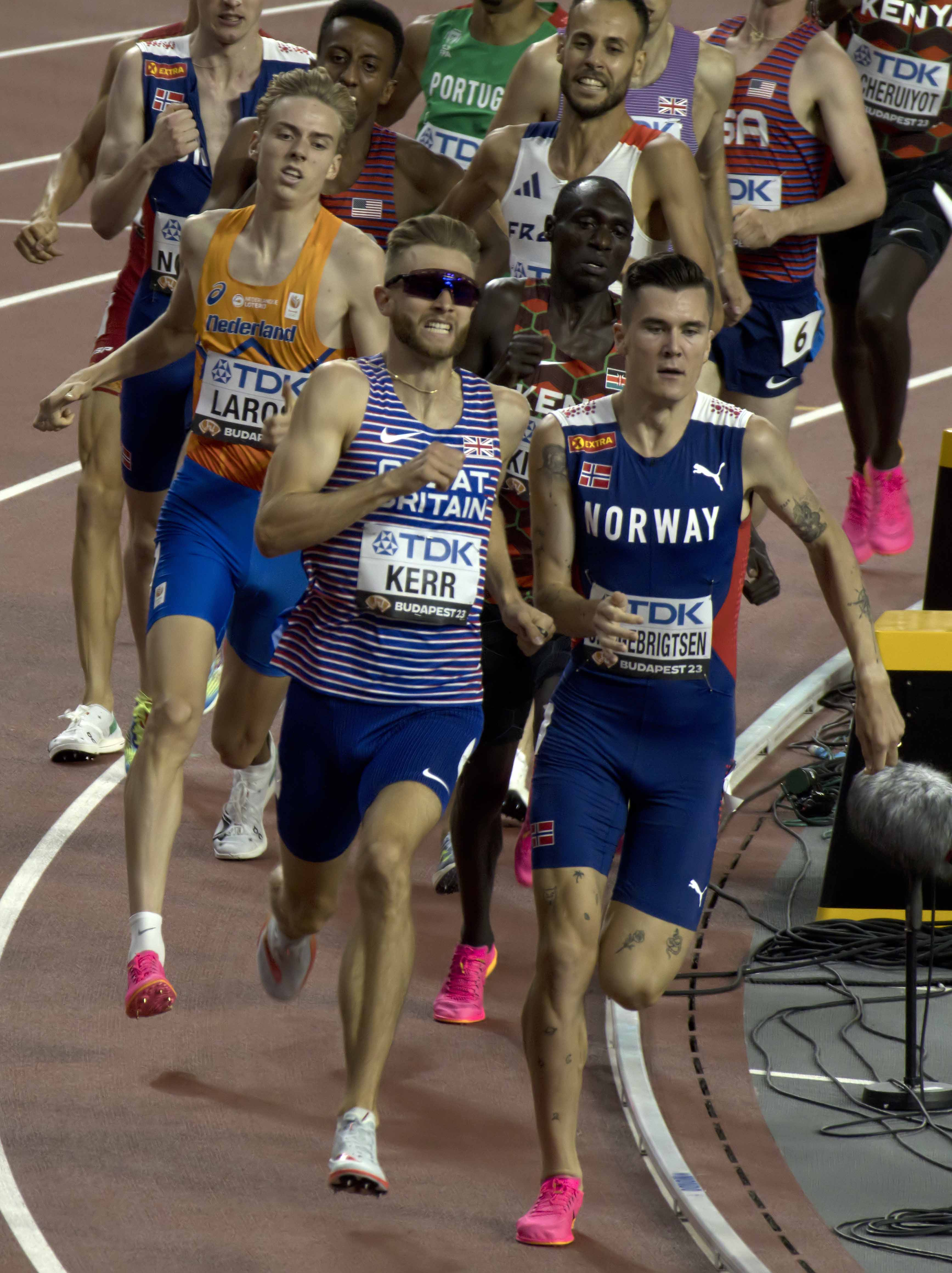
Pre-race favorites Josh Kerr and Jakob Ingebrigtsen, pictured at the 2023 World Championships, finished 2nd and 4th respectively in the 2024 Olympic 1500m final

Rank	Athlete	Nation	Time	Notes
1	Jakob Ingebrigtsen	Norway	3:32.38	Q
2	Josh Kerr	Great Britain	3:32.46	Q
3	Cole Hocker	United States	3:32.54	Q
4	Brian Komen	Kenya	3:32.57	Q
5	Stefan Nillessen	Netherlands	3:32.73	Q, PB
6	Pietro Arese	Italy	3:33.03	Q
7	Robert Farken	Germany	3:33.35	
8	Isaac Nader	Portugal	3:34.75	
9	Federico Riva	Italy	3:35.26	
10	Reynold Kipkorir Cheruiyot	Kenya	3:35.32	
11	George Mills	Great Britain	3:37.12	
12	Ermias Girma	Ethiopia	3:40.27	

=== Final ===
The final was held on 6 August at 20:50 (UTC+2) in the evening.

The race, as expected, was led by the defending Olympic champion and Olympic record holder Jakob Ingebrigtsen nearly wire-to-wire. However in the final 100 metres, Josh Kerr began to move quickly on the outside. As Kerr attempted to pass, Ingebrigtsen drifted slightly from the rail to force Kerr to run wide, allowing Cole Hocker of the United States, known for his finishing kick, to pass on the inside. Kerr appeared to be in position to pull away and win down the home stretch, but Hocker, having run less distance out of the turn, caught him with about 10 metres remaining to win.

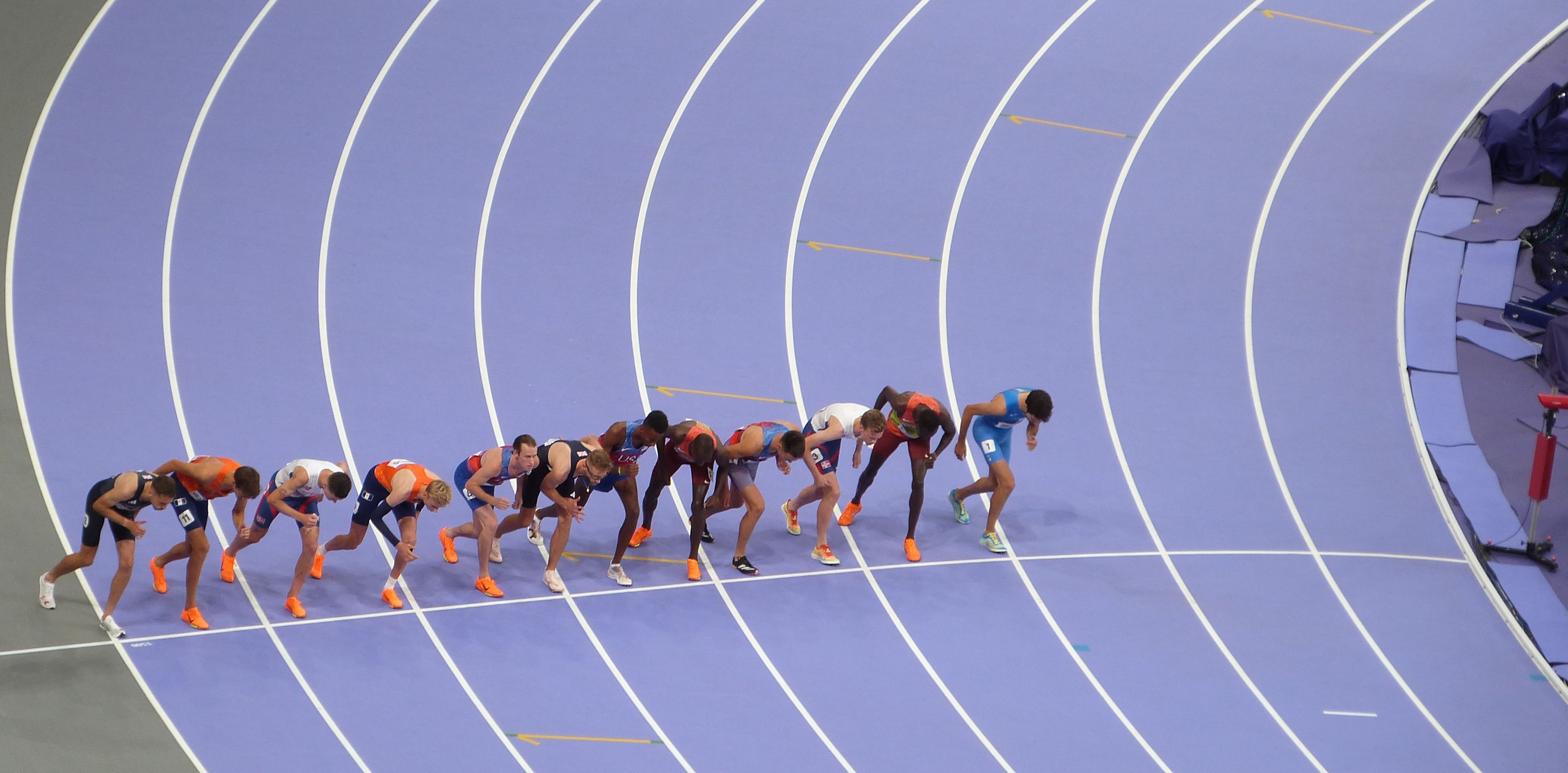
Start of the race

Yared Nuguse took third, nearly catching Kerr, with Ingebrigtsen shockingly having finished out of a medal position.

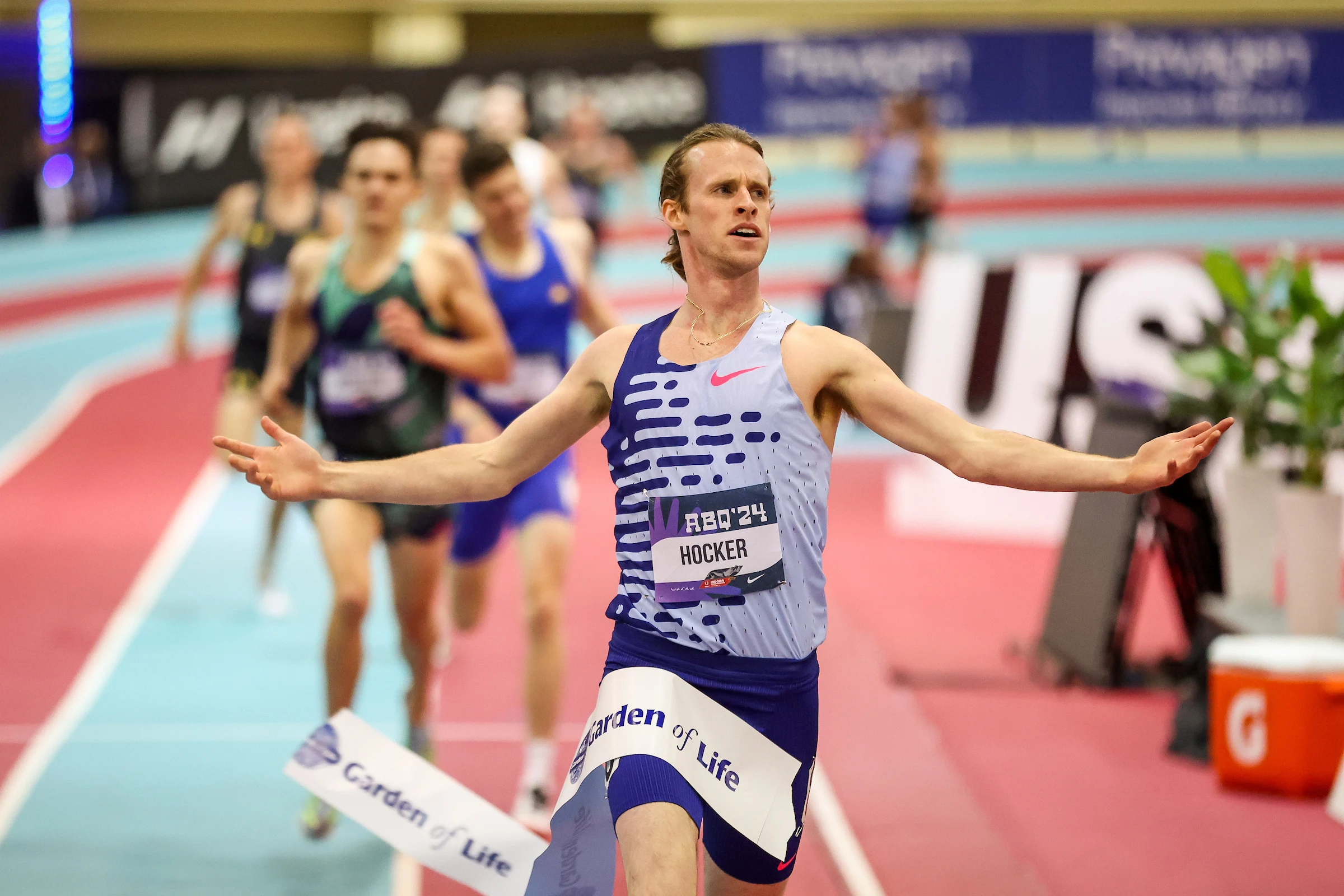
Cole Hocker, the 2024 Olympic Champion, pictured winning the 1500m at the 2024 USA Indoor Track and Field Championships

Rank	Athlete	Nation	Time	Notes
1st place, gold medalist(s)	Cole Hocker	United States	3:27.65	OR, AR
2nd place, silver medalist(s)	Josh Kerr	Great Britain	3:27.79	NR
3rd place, bronze medalist(s)	Yared Nuguse	United States	3:27.80	PB
4	Jakob Ingebrigtsen	Norway	3:28.24	
5	Hobbs Kessler	United States	3:29.45	PB
6	Niels Laros	Netherlands	3:29.54	NR, AU20R
7	Narve Gilje Nordås	Norway	3:30.46	SB
8	Pietro Arese	Italy	3:30.74	NR
9	Stefan Nillessen	Netherlands	3:30.75	PB
10	Neil Gourley	Great Britain	3:30.88	
11	Timothy Cheruiyot	Kenya	3:31.35	
12	Brian Komen	Kenya	3:35.59	
