= Ethan Strand =

American middle-distance runner (born 2002)

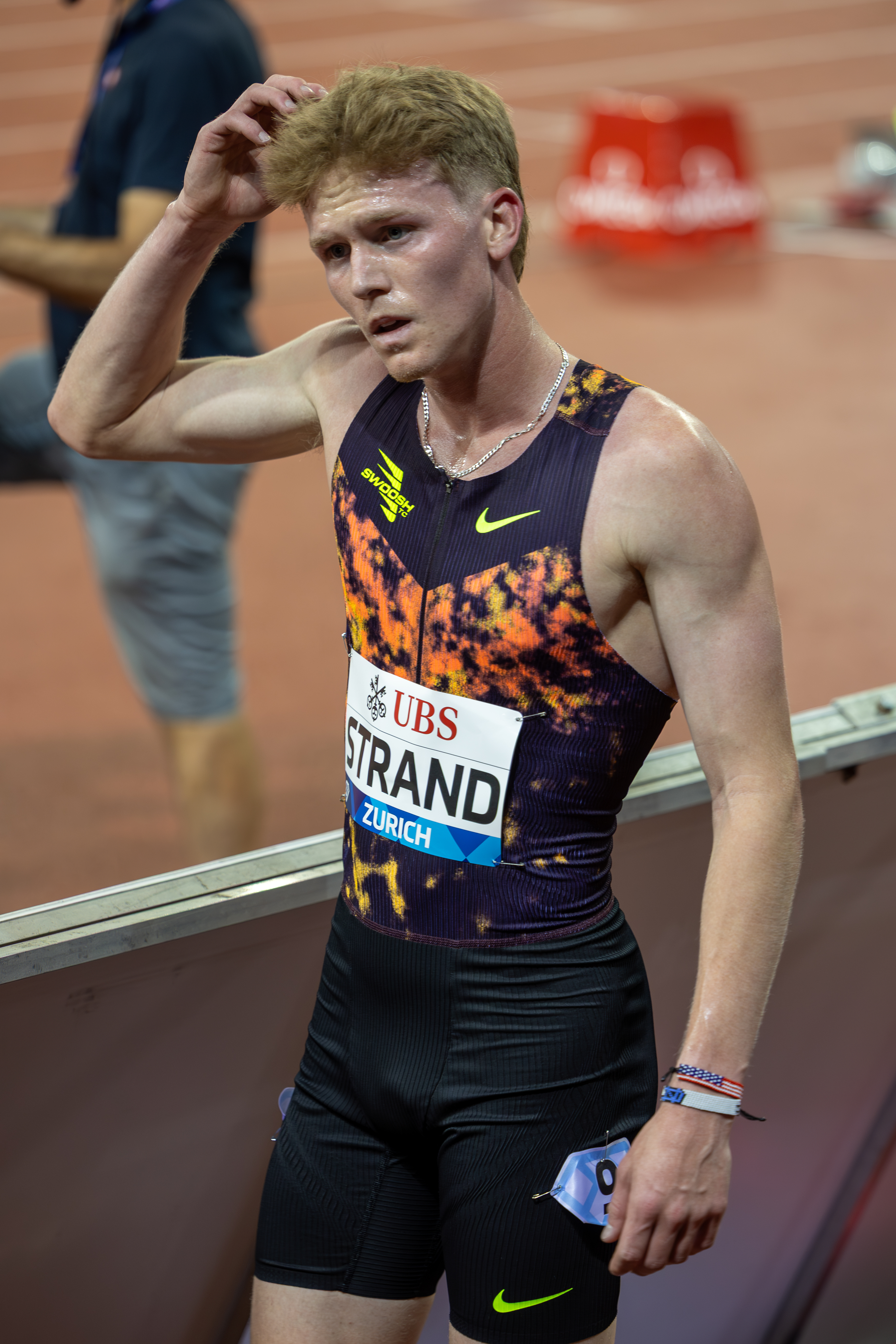
- Strand at the 2026 Weltklasse Zürich

Personal information
- Nationality: American
- Born: October 20, 2002 (age 24)
- Home town: Birmingham, Alabama, U.S.
- Education: Vestavia Hills High School

Sport
- Country: United States
- Sport: Track and field, cross country
- Event: 1500m–3000m
- University team: North Carolina Tar Heels
- Club: Nike
- Turned pro: 2025
- Coached by: Chris Miltenberg (2021-2025); Mike Smith (2025-)

Achievements and titles
- Personal bests: *All information from athlete's World Athletics profile unless otherwise noted.: 800 m: 1:51.08i (Birmingham 2021); 1500 m: 3:30.25 (Eugene 2025); Mile: 3:48.32i NCAA Record (Boston 2025); 3000 m: 7:30.15i NCAA Record (Boston 2024); 5000 m: 13:26.60i (Louisville 2025); 10,000 m: 29:43.42 (Durham 2025)

Ethan Strand (born October 20, 2002) is an American middle-distance runner who specializes in the 1500 meters, mile, and 3000 meters. He holds collegiate records over the short track mile and 3000 meters, which he set while competing for the North Carolina Tar Heels. Strand is a two-time US Champion, having won the NCAA Indoor Championship in the 3000 meters and the USATF Outdoor Championship in the 1500 meters.

== Early life and education ==
Strand attended Vestavia Hills High School, located near Birmingham, Alabama. His father Scott is a graduate of Auburn University and the former coach of the men's track team at the University of Alabama at Birmingham, while his mother Lori is a former cross country coach at Samford University. Strand is a two-time winner of the Alabama Gatorade Cross Country Player of the Year award.

== NCAA career ==
In June 2024, Strand reached the 1500 meter final of the United States Olympic Trials. He was one of five collegians to make the race.

On November 23, 2024, Strand finished eighth in the 2024 NCAA Division I Cross Country Championships in Madison, Wisconsin, in a time of 28:53.0. His teammate, Parker Wolfe, finished one place ahead at 28:50.2.

On December 7, 2024, in Boston, Strand broke Drew Bosley's former NCAA record in the short track 3000 meters of 7:36.42 by more than six seconds, running 7:30.15. Strand out-kicked his teammate Parker Wolfe in the final straightaway, who ran 7:30.23.

On February 1, 2025, in Boston, Strand broke Cooper Teare’s former NCAA record in the short track mile of 3:50.39 by over two seconds, running 3:48.32. Strand accelerated past Robert Farken of On Athletics Club Boulder, closing in 27.10 seconds for his last 200m. Strand's time places him as the seventh fastest indoor miler of all time.

In March 2025, at the NCAA Division I Indoor Championships, Strand won an NCAA title over the 3000 meter distance, with a winning time of 7:52.03.

== Professional career ==
On July 5, 2025, Strand won the International Mile at the Prefontaine Classic, with an outdoor personal best of 3:48.86. That same month, he signed a professional contract with Nike. On August 2, 2025, Strand finished second to Jonah Koech in the 1500 meter final at the 2025 USA Outdoor Track and Field Championships, in a personal best time of 3:30.25, then placed 16th in the 1500 meters at the 2025 World Championships in Tokyo, Japan. Koech was later disqualified for blood doping and his result vacated, moving Strand into first place.

Strand won the Diamond League race over 1500 m in Silesia in August 2026.
