= Robert Farken =

German athlete (born 1997)

- Farken in 2022

Personal information
- Nationality: German
- Born: 20 September 1997 (age 29)

Sport
- Sport: Track and Field
- Events: 800 m, 1500 m
Medal record
Men's athletics
Representing Germany
World Road Running Championships
Gold medal – first place	2026 Copenhagen	Mile

Robert Farken (born 20 September 1997) is a German middle distance runner. He won the mile run at the World Athletics Road Running Championships in 2026. He is the German national record holder over 1500 metres and the mile, both indoors and outdoors, and is a multiple-time German champion.

== Biography ==
From Leipzig, Farken had a promising start to his career before an achilles tendon injury slowed his progress. In 2016, Farken was runner-up over 800 m at the German youth indoor championships. In the same year he was the fastest U20 runner in Europe over 800 m. Farken ran this best time at the evening sports festival in Pfungstadt, but this came after the selection period for participation in the U20 World Championships in Bydgoszcz had finished so he was not able to compete. In 2017 Farken became German indoor champion over 800 meters in his first start in the men's class in Leipzig. At the evening sports festival in Erfurt on January 27, he qualified for the indoor European championships in Belgrade with a personal best of 1:47.65 minutes.

In June 2021, in Braunschweig, he not only ran a championship record (3:34.64 minutes) over 1500 m, but he also made the Olympic qualifying time ensuring his place at the delayed 2020 Tokyo Olympics, a great result for the many Germans waiting to see Farken in the Olympics. In Tokyo Farken qualified from his heat before finishing in eighth in his semi final race. Despite his early exit from medal contention, he managed to earn the nickname “Farken Fast”. In February, 2022 Farken became German champion over 1500 metres indoors for the first time, winning at his home track in Leipzig.

He won the 1500 metres at the 2024 BAUHAUS-galan in Stockholm on 2 June 2024. He was selected for the 2024 European Athletics Championships in Rome but did not qualify for the final. He competed at the 2024 Summer Olympics over 1500 metres, reaching the semi-final.

On 6 June 2025, he ran 3:30.80 to set a new national record in the 1500 metres at the 2025 Golden Gala in Rome. He ran a national record 3:49.12 in the Dream Mile at the 2025 Bislett Games in Oslo on 12 June 2025. He placed ninth over 1500 metres at the Diamond League Final in Zurich on 28 August.

In September 2025, he was a finalist over 1500 metres at the 2025 World Championships in Tokyo, Japan, placing sixth overall.

In March 2026, he was selected for the 2026 World Athletics Indoor Championships in Poland, running the 1500 metres in 3:41.79 without advancing to the final. On 4 July, Farken ran a new German national record with 3:47.76 in the Bowerman mile at the 2026 Prefontaine Classic. Competing at the 2026 London Athletics Meet on 18 July, Farken finished fourth in the mile run in a German record of 3:46.82, in the same race as Josh Kerr set a new world record. In August, he competed at the 2026 European Athletics Championships in Birmingham, England, placing ninth in the final of the 1500 metres. At the 2026 Diamond League Final in Brussels in September, he placed ninth over 1500 metres. The following week, he placed eleventh over 1500 m at the inaugural World Ultimate Championship in Budapest. He won the mile run at the World Athletics Road Running Championships on 19 September 2026, overtaking Yared Nuguse in the closing stages. His time of 3:51.80 moved him to second on the world all-time list for the road mile.

== Personal bests ==
- 800 m: 1:45.65 (Karlsruhe 2023)
  - Indoor: 1:47.00 (Dortmund 2024)
- 1000 m: 2:15.81 (Leipzig 2021)
- 1500 m: 3:30.09 (London 2026) NR
  - Indoor: 3:33.14 (New York 2025) NR
- Mile: 3:46.82 (London 2026) NR
  - Indoor: 3:49.44 (Boston 2025) NR
- 3000 m indoors: 7:51.42 (Karlsruhe 2022)
