= 1986 IAAF World Cross Country Championships – Senior men's race =

Senior men's race at the 1986 IAAF World Cross Country Championships
- Organisers: IAAF
- Edition: 14th
- Date: March 23
- Host city: Colombier, Neuchâtel, Switzerland
- Venue: Planeyse Colombier
- Events: 1
- Distances: 12 km – Senior men
- Participation: 337 athletes from 50 nations

The Senior men's race at the 1986 IAAF World Cross Country Championships was held in Colombier, Neuchâtel, Switzerland, at the Planeyse Colombier on March 23, 1986. A report on the event was given in the Glasgow Herald and in the Evening Times.

Complete results, medallists, and the results of British athletes were published.

== Race results ==
=== Senior men's race (12 km) ===
==== Individual ====
Rank	Athlete	Country	Time
1st place, gold medalist(s)	John Ngugi	Kenya	35:32.9
2nd place, silver medalist(s)	Abebe Mekonnen	Ethiopia	35:34.8
3rd place, bronze medalist(s)	Joseph Kiptum	Kenya	35:39.8
4	Bekele Debele	Ethiopia	35:42.6
5	Paul Kipkoech	Kenya	35:47.2
6	Pat Porter	United States	35:48.4
7	Kipsubai Koskei	Kenya	35:54.8
8	Some Muge	Kenya	35:55.7
9	Alberto Cova	Italy	35:58.8
10	John Easker	United States	35:59.9
11	Ezequiel Canario	Portugal	36:03.9
12	Thierry Watrice	France	36:05
13	Ed Eyestone	United States	36:05.9
14	Rob de Castella	Australia	36:10.9
15	Bruce Bickford	United States	36:12.1
16	Dave Clarke	England	36:14.4
17	Paul McCloy	Canada	36:16.3
18	Dionísio Castro	Portugal	36:17.4
19	John Woods	Ireland	36:19.8
20	Santiago Llorente	Spain	36:22.5
21	Andrew Masai	Kenya	36:23.9
22	Steve Moneghetti	Australia	36:25.2
23	Gelindo Bordin	Italy	36:26.4
24	Paul Arpin	France	36:28.1
25	Steve Binns	England	36:29.4
26	Wolde Silasse Melkessa	Ethiopia	36:32.6
27	Mohammed Kedir	Ethiopia	36:33.5
28	Wodajo Bulti	Ethiopia	36:34.9
29	Geir Kvernmo	Norway	36:35.7
30	Adam Hoyle	Australia	36:36.4
31	Domingos Castro	Portugal	36:36.9
32	Haji Bulbula	Ethiopia	36:37.4
33	Pierre Levisse	France	36:38.4
34	Stefano Mei	Italy	36:38.9
35	Boniface Merande	Kenya	36:39.5
36	Chala Urgessa	Ethiopia	36:40.1
37	Shuichi Yoneshige	Japan	36:42.3
38	Roy Andersen	Norway	36:43
39	José da Silva	Brazil	36:43.8
40	David Burridge	New Zealand	36:44.9
41	Francisco Sánchez	Spain	36:45.5
42	Vicente Polo	Spain	36:47
43	Joshua Kipkemboi	Kenya	36:47.5
44	Giuseppe Miccoli	Italy	36:48.3
45	Sisa Kirati	Kenya	36:49.9
46	Mats Erixon	Sweden	36:50.9
47	Pascal Debacker	France	36:54
48	Markus Ryffel	Switzerland	36:55
49	Lars-Erik Nilsson	Sweden	36:55.9
50	Constantino Esparcia	Spain	36:56.3
51	João Campos	Portugal	36:56.7
52	Vincent Rousseau	Belgium	36:57
53	Zhang Guowei	China	36:57.7
54	Jean-Louis Prianon	France	36:58.3
55	Tony Milovsorov	England	36:59.2
56	Stane Rozman	Yugoslavia	37:00.5
57	Abderrazak Gtari	Tunisia	37:01.8
58	Eddy de Pauw	Belgium	37:03.2
59	Antonio Humberto	Colombia	37:03.7
60	Larbi El Mouadden	Morocco	37:04
61	Tonnie Dirks	Netherlands	37:04.3
62	Salvatore Bettiol	Italy	37:04.7
63	Dereje Nedi	Ethiopia	37:04.9
64	Joaquim Silva	Portugal	37:05.2
65	Jan Hagelbrand	Sweden	37:05.6
66	Shozo Shimoju	Japan	37:05.9
67	Alfonso Alvarez	Spain	37:08
68	Adauto Domingues	Brazil	37:08.9
69	Art Boileau	Canada	37:09
70	Jari Nurmisto	Finland	37:09.7
71	Xing Zhenglang	China	37:10.4
72	Paul O'Callaghan	Ireland	37:11.3
73	Niels Kim Hjorth	Denmark	37:11.9
74	Tim Hutchings	England	37:12.4
75	Garry Henry	Australia	37:12.9
76	Karol Dolega	Poland	37:14.1
77	Antonio Lupianez	Spain	37:15.4
78	Mohamed Salah Rajhi	Tunisia	37:16.1
79	Alan Scharsu	United States	37:25.7
80	Dave Lewis	England	37:26.1
81	Craig Virgin	United States	37:26.4
82	Kozu Akutsu	Japan	37:26.7
83	Eloi Schleder	Brazil	37:27
84	Marco Gozzano	Italy	37:27.3
85	Jean-Yves Berau	France	37:27.6
86	Fethi Manai	Tunisia	37:28
87	Jeff Drenth	United States	37:28.7
88	Joaquim Pinheiro	Portugal	37:30.1
89	Martin Vrabel	Czechoslovakia	37:30.5
90	Ivan Konovalov	Soviet Union	37:30.8
91	Jef Gees	Belgium	37:31.7
92	Salvatore Nicosia	Italy	37:32.7
93	Javier Sanmartin	Spain	37:34.1
94	Ranieri Carenza	Italy	37:35
95	Jean-Pierre Paumen	Belgium	37:36.2
96	Terry Greene	Northern Ireland	37:36.2
97	John Bowden	New Zealand	37:36.2
98	Michael Scheytt	West Germany	37:36.3
99	Randy Reina	United States	37:36.3
100	Paul Wheeler	Wales	37:36.3
101	Thierry Pantel	France	37:36.4
102	Volker Welzel	West Germany	37:36.6
103	Abdellah El Hatimi	Morocco	37:37
104	Dominique Coux	France	37:37.1
105	Tadayoshi Kametaka	Japan	37:37.1
106	Peter Renner	New Zealand	37:37.1
107	Geoff Shaw	New Zealand	37:37.2
108	Habib Romdani	Tunisia	37:37.9
109	João de Sousa	Brazil	37:38.1
110	Andrew Wilton	England	37:38.4
111	Alain Bordeleau	Canada	37:38.9
112	Valentin Rodríguez	Spain	37:39
113	Willy Goddaert	Belgium	37:39.2
114	Kerry Rodger	New Zealand	37:39.4
115	Oddmund Roalkvam	Norway	37:39.5
116	Peter Wirz	Switzerland	37:39.5
117	Kevin Capper	England	37:39.7
118	Richard O'Flynn	Ireland	37:40
119	Satoshi Kato	Japan	37:40.4
120	Diamantino dos Santos	Brazil	37:40.7
121	Rheal Desjardins	Canada	37:41
122	John Robson	Scotland	37:41.3
123	Mohamed El Bali	Morocco	37:41.9
124	Kimball Reynierse	Netherlands	37:56.6
125	Willy van Huylenbroeck	Belgium	37:57
126	Lakbir Ghanmi	Morocco	37:58.2
127	Karel Lismont	Belgium	37:58.5
128	Wami Alemayehu	Ethiopia	37:58.8
129	John Treacy	Ireland	37:59.3
130	Marc de Blander	Belgium	37:59.7
131	Boguslaw Psujek	Poland	38:00.1
132	Peter Brett	Australia	38:00.3
133	Farai Kamucheka	Zimbabwe	38:00.6
134	Terence Mitchell	Scotland	38:00.9
135	Henrik Albahn	Denmark	38:01.2
136	Lars Sörensen	Finland	38:01.7
137	Abdellah Boubia	Morocco	38:02
138	Markus Hacksteiner	Switzerland	38:03.4
139	Danny Boltz	Australia	38:03.9
140	Martti Vainio	Finland	38:04.5
141	Werner Grommisch	West Germany	38:07.7
142	Noel Harvey	Ireland	38:08.8
143	Kazimierz Lasecki	Poland	38:09.3
144	Cui Yulin	China	38:10.1
145	Hichem Oueslati	Tunisia	38:10.6
146	Jiu Shangxuan	China	38:11
147	Charles Haskett	Scotland	38:11.1
148	Shuzo Nakajima	Japan	38:11.1
149	Jari Hemmilä	Finland	38:11.1
150	Graham Clews	Australia	38:11.1
151	Engelbert Franz	West Germany	38:11.1
152	Roy Dooney	Ireland	38:11.1
153	Arnold Mächler	Switzerland	38:11.1
154	Bob Treadwell	England	38:11.1
155	Henryk Lupa	Poland	38:11.1
156	Waldemar Niklewicz	Poland	38:11.2
157	Gerry Deegan	Ireland	38:12
158	Juhani Holopainen	Finland	38:12
159	Doug Cronkite	Canada	38:12
160	James Gombedza	Zimbabwe	38:12
161	Ahmed Chantibou	Morocco	38:12
162	Kenneth Davies	Wales	38:12
163	Herbert Stephan	West Germany	38:12
164	Mike Quinn	Hong Kong	38:12
165	Tommy Ekblom	Finland	38:13.9
166	Ken Moloney	New Zealand	38:14.5
167	Keld Johnsen	Denmark	38:15.5
168	Tommy Persson	Sweden	38:16.9
169	Deon McNeilly	Northern Ireland	38:17.6
170	Chris Robison	Scotland	38:18.1
171	Bill Britton	Canada	38:18.6
172	Abdelrahman Massad	Sudan	38:19.5
173	Fraser Clyne	Scotland	38:20.9
174	Brahim Ayachi	Tunisia	38:21.6
175	Ole Hansen	Denmark	38:22.2
176	Pierre-Andre Gobet	Switzerland	38:22.6
177	Hans-Jürgen Orthmann	West Germany	38:23
178	Claudio Ribeiro	Brazil	38:23.3
179	Rex Wilson	New Zealand	38:25.4
180	Peder Poulsen	Sweden	38:26.1
181	Stig Nørregaard	Denmark	38:26.5
182	Romauld Krupanek	Poland	38:26.9
183	Ian Damian	Belgium	38:27.2
184	Timo Järvinen	Sweden	38:27.6
185	Ieuan Ellis	Wales	38:28.4
186	Masaru Matsuda	Japan	38:29.3
187	Gentil de Mello	Brazil	38:30
188	Mehmet Terzi	Turkey	38:30.6
189	Féthi Baccouche	Tunisia	38:32.4
190	Markus Graf	Switzerland	38:33.5
191	Aart Stigter	Netherlands	38:35.7
192	Filippos Filippou	Cyprus	38:37.6
193	Adrian Callan	Scotland	38:38
194	Truls Nygaard	Norway	38:38.7
195	Herman Hofstee	Netherlands	38:39.7
196	James Stafford	Canada	38:40.1
197	Garry Briggs	Australia	38:40.4
198	Luciano Carchesio	Italy	38:41.1
199	Chris Buckley	Wales	38:41.6
200	Esa Liedes	Finland	38:42
201	Keijo Kanniainen	Finland	38:42.6
202	Bruno Lafranchi	Switzerland	38:45.3
203	Ivan Uvizl	Czechoslovakia	38:46.5
204	Wiktor Sawicki	Poland	38:47.3
205	Zeki Atli	Turkey	38:47.7
206	Masami Otsuka	Japan	38:48.3
207	José Bautista	Colombia	38:49.3
208	Richard Mulligan	Ireland	38:49.6
209	Michael Spöttel	West Germany	38:49.9
210	Sun Zhiqing	China	38:50.5
211	Bruce Wainman	Canada	38:51
212	Sadik Salman	Turkey	38:51.7
213	Hwang Wen-Cheng	Chinese Taipei	38:51.8
214	Mike Bishop	Wales	38:53.8
215	K. Babu	India	38:57.9
216	Salem Majdoubi	Morocco	38:58.7
217	Steven Doig	Scotland	39:01.1
218	Slawomir Gurny	Poland	39:01.5
219	Joseph Mitshipsi	Zimbabwe	39:02
220	Ahmet Altun	Turkey	39:03.9
221	Jørn Holmen	Norway	39:04.5
222	Basir Hammad	Sudan	39:05.9
223	Robert de Brouwer	Netherlands	39:07
224	Dale Rixon	Wales	39:08.6
225	Michael Délèze	Switzerland	39:09.2
226	Tomasz Zimny	Poland	39:10.1
227	Viday Dhar	India	39:10.6
228	Marcel Versteeg	Netherlands	39:10.9
229	Gord Christie	Canada	39:11.2
230	Svein Erik Eide	Norway	39:19.8
231	Anour Hak	Sudan	39:20.7
232	Jens Hansen	Denmark	39:21.7
233	Adrie Hartveld	Netherlands	39:22.3
234	Esau Magwaza	Zimbabwe	39:23.9
235	Steve Begen	Scotland	39:29.7
236	Ahmed Adam	Sudan	39:32.5
237	Jacques Krähenbühl	Switzerland	39:34.7
238	Mehmet Genc	Turkey	39:36.8
239	Swarn Singh	India	39:37.2
240	John Walsh	Northern Ireland	39:37.7
241	Alfredo Castro	Puerto Rico	39:39
242	John Campbell	New Zealand	39:39.6
243	Musa Gouda	Sudan	39:40.7
244	T. Shamsuddin	India	39:41.9
245	Jabbar Abdul	Sudan	39:43
246	Tom Breen	Northern Ireland	39:44.3
247	Eddie Oxlade	Northern Ireland	39:49.5
248	Liu Chang-Chung	Chinese Taipei	39:50.9
249	Tapfumanei Jonga	Zimbabwe	39:51.5
250	Paulo Catarino	Portugal	39:53.4
251	Salih Nour	Sudan	39:54
252	Alan Cole	Wales	39:54.6
253	Ernie Cunningham	Northern Ireland	39:55.2
254	Mohamed Nekkachi	Morocco	39:56.5
255	Raul Rivera	Puerto Rico	39:58.2
256	Aita Bdr. Limbu	Hong Kong	40:00
257	Tommy Nordh	Sweden	40:00.5
258	Patrick Nyambariro-Nhauro	Zimbabwe	40:02.9
259	Keith Cawley	Hong Kong	40:03.8
260	Suresh Pandey	India	40:11
261	Steve Smith	Wales	40:12.7
262	Joseph Cross	Jamaica	40:14.3
263	Faycal M'hamdi	Tunisia	40:15.7
264	John Doyle	Ireland	40:23.5
265	Nicos Vasiliou	Cyprus	40:26.9
266	Anna Durai	India	40:27.3
267	Chang Yung-Cheng	Chinese Taipei	40:30.9
268	Paul Lawther	Northern Ireland	40:38.3
269	Mbiganyi Thee	Botswana	40:38.8
270	Hsu Gi-Sheng	Chinese Taipei	40:52.1
271	Robert Jhurrea	Mauritius	40:53.1
272	Vasilios Chimonis	Cyprus	40:57.5
273	Bruno Le Stum	France	40:58.7
274	Baldev Singh	India	40:59.4
275	Paul Spowage	Hong Kong	41:01.7
276	Ali Sofyan Siregar	Indonesia	41:04.4
277	Spyros Spyrou	Cyprus	41:06.9
278	Hon Kwai Kwok	Hong Kong	41:08.2
279	Ahmad Gharib	Kuwait	41:09
280	Nihat Yaylali	Turkey	41:11.2
281	Mohiyi el Din El Sayed	Egypt	41:15.8
282	Lee Yin-Sheng	Chinese Taipei	41:17.1
283	Demetrios Thephylactou	Cyprus	41:18.2
284	Chauderanoth Tengar	Mauritius	41:23
285	Mkondya Deo	Tanzania	41:36.6
286	Ja.I. Singh	India	41:40.2
287	Vijay Kumar Mishra	India	41:41.9
288	Wilson Theleso	Botswana	41:42.5
289	Ho Hsin-Ye	Chinese Taipei	41:42.9
290	Jean Fasnacht	Hong Kong	41:45.3
291	Mohamed Idriss	Egypt	41:45.7
292	Charles Portelli	Malta	41:48
293	Juan Velez	Puerto Rico	41:49
294	Cebert Cooper	Jamaica	41:57.8
295	Paul Smith	Jamaica	42:09.3
296	Samuel Doherty	Northern Ireland	42:17.2
297	Pradeed Gohkool	Mauritius	42:18.6
298	Jairo Correa	Colombia	42:20.1
299	Saleh Haji Ali	Kuwait	42:20.7
300	Wageh Hafez	Egypt	42:26.7
301	Chou Hsien-Kuang	Chinese Taipei	42:28
302	Kharalambos Pratsis	Cyprus	42:30.9
303	Marlon Williams	U.S. Virgin Islands	42:33.3
304	Joseph Crossley	Hong Kong	42:36.2
305	Efthymious Loizi	Cyprus	42:38.9
306	Benjamin Arthe	Mauritius	42:42.3
307	Linton McKenzie	Jamaica	42:42.3
308	Mario Hammett	Malta	42:56.6
309	Patrick Pirante	Mauritius	43:00.2
310	Ahmad Al-Hajry	Kuwait	43:02
311	Gatol Sudarsono	Indonesia	43:07
312	Ahmed Mohamed Elwan	Egypt	43:11.3
313	Maurice Szeto-Jan	Hong Kong	43:13.2
314	Gerard Degaetano	Malta	43:14.8
315	Satish Huryl	Mauritius	43:17.5
316	Badr Aly Aly	Egypt	43:22.9
317	Chris Casser Torregiano	Malta	43:45.5
318	Mohamed Mohsen Sayed	Egypt	44:03.7
319	Roger Taylor	Jamaica	44:09.8
320	Gladstone Jones	Jamaica	44:21.7
321	Joe Micallef	Malta	44:26.1
322	Costanzi Peter Borg	Malta	44:36.1
323	Saleh Darwish Ismail	Kuwait	44:54.5
324	Manahy Falah Al-Azhni	Kuwait	44:56.5
325	Marios Patsalides	Cyprus	44:58.9
326	Joseph Farrugia	Malta	45:03.9
327	Wallace Williams	U.S. Virgin Islands	45:51.7
328	Frans Abela	Malta	46:03.8
—	Keith Brantly	United States	DNF
—	Åke Eriksson	Sweden	DNF
—	Antonio Leitão	Portugal	DNF
—	Fernando Mamede	Portugal	DNF
—	Mike McLeod	England	DNF
—	Luis Adsuara	Spain	DNF
—	Lars Ericsson	Sweden	DNF
—	Neil Tennant	Scotland	DNF
—	John Jenkins	Wales	DNF

==== Teams ====
Rank	Team	Points
1st place, gold medalist(s)	Kenya: John Ngugi / 1; Joseph Kiptum / 3; Paul Kipkoech / 5; Kipsubai Koskei / 7; Some Muge / 8; Andrew Masai / 21; (Boniface Merande) / (35); (Joshua Kipkemboi) / (43); (Sisa Kirati) / (45)	45
2nd place, silver medalist(s)	Ethiopia: Abebe Mekonnen / 2; Bekele Debele / 4; Wolde Silasse Melkessa / 26; Mohammed Kedir / 27; Wodajo Bulti / 28; Haji Bulbula / 32; (Chala Urgessa) / (36); (Dereje Nedi) / (63); (Wami Alemayehu) / (128)	119
3rd place, bronze medalist(s)	United States: Pat Porter / 6; John Easker / 10; Ed Eyestone / 13; Bruce Bickford / 15; Alan Scharsu / 79; Craig Virgin / 81; (Jeff Drenth) / (87); (Randy Reina) / (99); (Keith Brantly) / (DNF)	204
4	France: Thierry Watrice / 12; Paul Arpin / 24; Pierre Levisse / 33; Pascal Debacker / 47; Jean-Louis Prianon / 54; Jean-Yves Berau / 85; (Thierry Pantel) / (101); (Dominique Coux) / (104); (Bruno Le Stum) / (273)	255
5	Italy: Alberto Cova / 9; Gelindo Bordin / 23; Stefano Mei / 34; Giuseppe Miccoli / 44; Salvatore Bettiol / 62; Marco Gozzano / 84; (Salvatore Nicosia) / (92); (Ranieri Carenza) / (94); (Luciano Carchesio) / (198)	256
6	Portugal: Ezequiel Canario / 11; Dionísio Castro / 18; Domingos Castro / 31; João Campos / 51; Joaquim Silva / 64; Joaquim Pinheiro / 88; (Paulo Catarino) / (250); (Antonio Leitão) / (DNF); (Fernando Mamede) / (DNF)	263
7	Spain: Santiago Llorente / 20; Francisco Sánchez / 41; Vicente Polo / 42; Constantino Esparcia / 50; Alfonso Alvarez / 67; Antonio Lupianez / 77; (Javier Sanmartin) / (93); (Valentin Rodríguez) / (112); (Luis Adsuara) / (DNF)	297
8	England: Dave Clarke / 16; Steve Binns / 25; Tony Milovsorov / 55; Tim Hutchings / 74; Dave Lewis / 80; Andrew Wilton / 110; (Kevin Capper) / (117); (Bob Treadwell) / (154); (Mike McLeod) / (DNF)	360
9	Australia: Rob de Castella / 14; Steve Moneghetti / 22; Adam Hoyle / 30; Garry Henry / 75; Peter Brett / 132; Danny Boltz / 139; (Graham Clews) / (150); (Garry Briggs) / (197)	412
10	Belgium: Vincent Rousseau / 52; Eddy de Pauw / 58; Jef Gees / 91; Jean-Pierre Paumen / 95; Willy Goddaert / 113; Willy van Huylenbroeck / 125; (Karel Lismont) / (127); (Marc de Blander) / (130); (Ian Damian) / (183)	534
11	Japan: Shuichi Yoneshige / 37; Shozo Shimoju / 66; Kozu Akutsu / 82; Tadayoshi Kametaka / 105; Satoshi Kato / 119; Shuzo Nakajima / 148; (Masaru Matsuda) / (186); (Masami Otsuka) / (206)	557
12	Brazil: José da Silva / 39; Adauto Domingues / 68; Eloi Schleder / 83; João de Sousa / 109; Diamantino dos Santos / 120; Claudio Ribeiro / 178; (Gentil de Mello) / (187)	597
13	New Zealand: David Burridge / 40; John Bowden / 97; Peter Renner / 106; Geoff Shaw / 107; Kerry Rodger / 114; Ken Moloney / 166; (Rex Wilson) / (179); (John Campbell) / (242)	630
14	Ireland: John Woods / 19; Paul O'Callaghan / 72; Richard O'Flynn / 118; John Treacy / 129; Noel Harvey / 142; Roy Dooney / 152; (Gerry Deegan) / (157); (Richard Mulligan) / (208); (John Doyle) / (264)	632
15	Canada: Paul McCloy / 17; Art Boileau / 69; Alain Bordeleau / 111; Rheal Desjardins / 121; Doug Cronkite / 159; Bill Britton / 171; (James Stafford) / (196); (Bruce Wainman) / (211); (Gord Christie) / (229)	648
16	Tunisia: Abderrazak Gtari / 57; Mohamed Salah Rajhi / 78; Fethi Manai / 86; Habib Romdani / 108; Hichem Oueslati / 145; Brahim Ayachi / 174; (Féthi Baccouche) / (189); (Faycal M'hamdi) / (263)	648
17	Sweden: Mats Erixon / 46; Lars-Erik Nilsson / 49; Jan Hagelbrand / 65; Tommy Persson / 168; Peder Poulsen / 180; Timo Järvinen / 184; (Tommy Nordh) / (257); (Åke Eriksson) / (DNF); (Lars Ericsson) / (DNF)	692
18	Morocco: Larbi El Mouadden / 60; Abdellah El Hatimi / 103; Mohamed El Bali / 123; Lakbir Ghanmi / 126; Abdellah Boubia / 137; Ahmed Chantibou / 161; (Salem Majdoubi) / (216); (Mohamed Nekkachi) / (254)	710
19	Finland: Jari Nurmisto / 70; Lars Sörensen / 136; Martti Vainio / 140; Jari Hemmilä / 149; Juhani Holopainen / 158; Tommy Ekblom / 165; (Esa Liedes) / (200); (Keijo Kanniainen) / (201)	818
20	Switzerland: Markus Ryffel / 48; Peter Wirz / 116; Markus Hacksteiner / 138; Arnold Mächler / 153; Pierre-Andre Gobet / 176; Markus Graf / 190; (Bruno Lafranchi) / (202); (Michael Délèze) / (225); (Jacques Krähenbühl) / (237)	821
21	Norway: Geir Kvernmo / 29; Roy Andersen / 38; Oddmund Roalkvam / 115; Truls Nygaard / 194; Jørn Holmen / 221; Svein Erik Eide / 230	827
22	West Germany: Michael Scheytt / 98; Volker Welzel / 102; Werner Grommisch / 141; Engelbert Franz / 151; Herbert Stephan / 163; Hans-Jürgen Orthmann / 177; (Michael Spöttel) / (209)	832
23	Poland: Karol Dolega / 76; Boguslaw Psujek / 131; Kazimierz Lasecki / 143; Henryk Lupa / 155; Waldemar Niklewicz / 156; Romauld Krupanek / 182; (Wiktor Sawicki) / (204); (Slawomir Gurny) / (218); (Tomasz Zimny) / (226)	843
24	Scotland: John Robson / 122; Terence Mitchell / 134; Charles Haskett / 147; Chris Robison / 170; Fraser Clyne / 173; Adrian Callan / 193; (Steven Doig) / (217); (Steve Begen) / (235); (Neil Tennant) / (DNF)	939
25	Denmark: Niels Kim Hjorth / 73; Henrik Albahn / 135; Keld Johnsen / 167; Ole Hansen / 175; Stig Nørregaard / 181; Jens Hansen / 232	963
26	Netherlands: Tonnie Dirks / 61; Kimball Reynierse / 124; Aart Stigter / 191; Herman Hofstee / 195; Robert de Brouwer / 223; Marcel Versteeg / 228; (Adrie Hartveld) / (233)	1022
27	Wales: Paul Wheeler / 100; Kenneth Davies / 162; Ieuan Ellis / 185; Chris Buckley / 199; Mike Bishop / 214; Dale Rixon / 224; (Alan Cole) / (252); (Steve Smith) / (261); (John Jenkins) / (DNF)	1084
28	Northern Ireland: Terry Greene / 96; Deon McNeilly / 169; John Walsh / 240; Tom Breen / 246; Eddie Oxlade / 247; Ernie Cunningham / 253; (Paul Lawther) / (268); (Samuel Doherty) / (296)	1251
29	Zimbabwe: Farai Kamucheka / 133; James Gombedza / 160; Joseph Mitshipsi / 219; Esau Magwaza / 234; Tapfumanei Jonga / 249; Patrick Nyambariro-Nhauro / 258	1253
30	Turkey: Mehmet Terzi / 188; Zeki Atli / 205; Sadik Salman / 212; Ahmet Altun / 220; Mehmet Genc / 238; Nihat Yaylali / 280	1343
31	Sudan: Abdelrahman Massad / 172; Basir Hammad / 222; Anour Hak / 231; Ahmed Adam / 236; Musa Gouda / 243; Jabbar Abdul / 245; (Salih Nour) / (251)	1349
32	India: K. Babu / 215; Viday Dhar / 227; Swarn Singh / 239; T. Shamsuddin / 244; Suresh Pandey / 260; Anna Durai / 266; (Baldev Singh) / (274); (Ja.I. Singh) / (286); (Vijay Kumar Mishra) / (287)	1451
33	Hong Kong: Mike Quinn / 164; Aita Bdr. Limbu / 256; Keith Cawley / 259; Paul Spowage / 275; Hon Kwai Kwok / 278; Jean Fasnacht / 290; (Joseph Crossley) / (304); (Maurice Szeto-Jan) / (313)	1522
34	Chinese Taipei: Hwang Wen-Cheng / 213; Liu Chang-Chung / 248; Chang Yung-Cheng / 267; Hsu Gi-Sheng / 270; Lee Yin-Sheng / 282; Ho Hsin-Ye / 289; (Chou Hsien-Kuang) / (301)	1569
35	Cyprus: Filippos Filippou / 192; Nicos Vasiliou / 265; Vasilios Chimonis / 272; Spyros Spyrou / 277; Demetrios Thephylactou / 283; Kharalambos Pratsis / 302; (Efthymious Loizi) / (305); (Marios Patsalides) / (325)	1591
36	Mauritius: Robert Jhurrea / 271; Chauderanoth Tengar / 284; Pradeed Gohkool / 297; Benjamin Arthe / 306; Patrick Pirante / 309; Satish Huryl / 315	1782
37	Jamaica: Joseph Cross / 262; Cebert Cooper / 294; Paul Smith / 295; Linton McKenzie / 307; Roger Taylor / 319; Gladstone Jones / 320	1797
38	Egypt: Mohiyi el Din El Sayed / 281; Mohamed Idriss / 291; Wageh Hafez / 300; Ahmed Mohamed Elwan / 312; Badr Aly Aly / 316; Mohamed Mohsen Sayed / 318	1818
39	Malta: Charles Portelli / 292; Mario Hammett / 308; Gerard Degaetano / 314; Chris Casser Torregiano / 317; Joe Micallef / 321; Costanzi Peter Borg / 322; (Joseph Farrugia) / (326); (Frans Abela) / (328)	1874

- Note: Athletes in parentheses did not score for the team result

== Participation ==
An unofficial count yields the participation of 337 athletes from 50 countries in the Senior men's race. This is in agreement with the official numbers as published.

- Australia (8)
- Belgium (9)
- Botswana (2)
- Brazil (7)
- Canada (9)
- China (5)
- Chinese Taipei (7)
- Colombia (3)
- Cyprus (8)
- Czechoslovakia (2)
- Denmark (6)
- Egypt (6)
- England (9)
- Ethiopia (9)
- Finland (8)
- France (9)
- Hong Kong (8)
- India (9)
- Indonesia (2)
- Ireland (9)
- Italy (9)
- Jamaica (6)
- Japan (8)
- Kenya (9)
- Kuwait (5)
- Malta (8)
- Mauritius (6)
- Morocco (8)
- Netherlands (7)
- New Zealand (8)
- Northern Ireland (8)
- Norway (6)
- Poland (9)
- Portugal (9)
- Puerto Rico (3)
- Scotland (9)
- Spain (9)
- Soviet Union (1)
- Sudan (7)
- Sweden (9)
- Switzerland (9)
- Tanzania (1)
- Tunisia (8)
- Turkey (6)
- United States (9)
- U.S. Virgin Islands (2)
- Wales (9)
- West Germany (7)
- Yugoslavia (1)
- Zimbabwe (6)

== See also ==
- 1986 IAAF World Cross Country Championships – Junior men's race
- 1986 IAAF World Cross Country Championships – Senior women's race
