= 1986 IAAF World Cross Country Championships =

- Organisers: IAAF
- Edition: 14th
- Date: March 23
- Host city: Colombier, Neuchâtel, Switzerland
- Venue: Planeyse Colombier
- Events: 3
- Distances: 12 km – Senior men 7.75 km – Junior men 4.65 km – Senior women
- Participation: 670 athletes from 57 nations

The 1986 IAAF World Cross Country Championships was held in Colombier, Neuchâtel, Switzerland, at the Planeyse Colombier on March 23, 1986. A report on the event was given in the Glasgow Herald and in the Evening Times.

Complete results for men, junior men, women, medallists, and the results of British athletes were published.

== Medallists ==
| Event | Gold | | Silver | | Bronze | |
|---|---|---|---|---|---|---|
Individual
| Senior men (12 km) | John Ngugi; Kenya | 35:32.9 | Abebe Mekonnen; Ethiopia | 35:34.8 | Joseph Kiptum; Kenya | 35:39.8 |
| Junior men (7.75 km) | Melese Feissa; Ethiopia | 22:47.6 | Sammy Bitok; Kenya | 22:52.7 | Demeke Bekele; Ethiopia | 22:56 |
| Senior women (4.65 km) | Zola Budd; England | 14:49.6 | Lynn Jennings; United States | 15:07.8 | Annette Sergent; France | 15:12.2 |
Team
| Senior men | Kenya | 45 | Ethiopia | 119 | United States | 204 |
| Junior men | Ethiopia | 13 | Kenya | 32 | Spain | 52 |
| Senior women | England | 65 | New Zealand | 67 | France | 76 |

== Race results ==
=== Senior men's race (12 km) ===
Individual race
| Rank | Athlete | Country | Time |
|---|---|---|---|
| 1st place, gold medalist(s) | John Ngugi | Kenya | 35:32.9 |
| 2nd place, silver medalist(s) | Abebe Mekonnen | Ethiopia | 35:34.8 |
| 3rd place, bronze medalist(s) | Joseph Kiptum | Kenya | 35:39.8 |
| 4 | Bekele Debele | Ethiopia | 35:42.6 |
| 5 | Paul Kipkoech | Kenya | 35:47.2 |
| 6 | Pat Porter | United States | 35:48.4 |
| 7 | Kipsubai Koskei | Kenya | 35:54.8 |
| 8 | Some Muge | Kenya | 35:55.7 |
| 9 | Alberto Cova | Italy | 35:58.8 |
| 10 | John Easker | United States | 35:59.9 |
| 11 | Ezequiel Canario | Portugal | 36:03.9 |
| 12 | Thierry Watrice | France | 36:05 |
Full results

Teams
| Rank | Team | Points |
|---|---|---|
| 1st place, gold medalist(s) | Kenya: John Ngugi / 1; Joseph Kiptum / 3; Paul Kipkoech / 5; Kipsubai Koskei / 7; Some Muge / 8; Andrew Masai / 21; (Boniface Merande) / (35); (Joshua Kipkemboi) / (43); (Sisa Kirati) / (45) | 45 |
| 2nd place, silver medalist(s) | Ethiopia: Abebe Mekonnen / 2; Bekele Debele / 4; Wolde Silasse Melkessa / 26; Mohammed Kedir / 27; Wodajo Bulti / 28; Haji Bulbula / 32; (Chala Urgessa) / (36); (Dereje Nedi) / (63); (Wami Alemayehu) / (128) | 119 |
| 3rd place, bronze medalist(s) | United States: Pat Porter / 6; John Easker / 10; Ed Eyestone / 13; Bruce Bickford / 15; Alan Scharsu / 79; Craig Virgin / 81; (Jeff Drenth) / (87); (Randy Reina) / (99); (Keith Brantly) / (DNF) | 204 |
| 4 | France | 255 |
| 5 | Italy | 256 |
| 6 | Portugal | 263 |
| 7 | Spain | 297 |
| 8 | England | 360 |
Full results

- Note: Athletes in parentheses did not score for the team result

=== Junior men's race (7.75 km) ===
Individual race
| Rank | Athlete | Country | Time |
|---|---|---|---|
| 1st place, gold medalist(s) | Melese Feissa | Ethiopia | 22:47.6 |
| 2nd place, silver medalist(s) | Sammy Bitok | Kenya | 22:52.7 |
| 3rd place, bronze medalist(s) | Demeke Bekele | Ethiopia | 22:56 |
| 4 | Rafera Workench | Ethiopia | 22:57.4 |
| 5 | Ararse Fuffa | Ethiopia | 23:06.1 |
| 6 | Habte Negash | Ethiopia | 23:07.4 |
| 7 | Brahim Boutayeb | Morocco | 23:09.4 |
| 8 | Alejandro Gómez | Spain | 23:17.3 |
| 9 | William Mutwol | Kenya | 23:21.6 |
| 10 | Peter Rono | Kenya | 23:33.7 |
| 11 | David Onwonga | Kenya | 23:35.9 |
| 12 | José Gruneiro | Spain | 23:41.8 |
Full results

Teams
| Rank | Team | Points |
|---|---|---|
| 1st place, gold medalist(s) | Ethiopia: Melese Feissa / 1; Demeke Bekele / 3; Rafera Workench / 4; Ararse Fuffa / 5; (Habte Negash) / (6); (Belayneh Tadesse) / (16) | 13 |
| 2nd place, silver medalist(s) | Kenya: Sammy Bitok / 2; William Mutwol / 9; Peter Rono / 10; David Onwonga / 11; (John Kiptum) / (28) | 32 |
| 3rd place, bronze medalist(s) | Spain: Alejandro Gómez / 8; José Gruneiro / 12; Anacleto Jiménez / 13; José Carlos Adán / 19; (Manuel Martín) / (46); (Mariano Campal) / (50) | 52 |
| 4 | Australia | 91 |
| 5 | United States | 94 |
| 6 | Morocco | 137 |
| 7 | Japan | 152 |
| 8 | Belgium | 159 |
Full results

- Note: Athletes in parentheses did not score for the team result

=== Senior women's race (4.65 km) ===
Individual race
| Rank | Athlete | Country | Time |
|---|---|---|---|
| 1st place, gold medalist(s) | Zola Budd | England | 14:49.6 |
| 2nd place, silver medalist(s) | Lynn Jennings | United States | 15:07.8 |
| 3rd place, bronze medalist(s) | Annette Sergent | France | 15:12.2 |
| 4 | Martine Fays | France | 15:14.3 |
| 5 | Rosa Mota | Portugal | 15:18.5 |
| 6 | Nan Doak | United States | 15:22.8 |
| 7 | Christine McMiken | New Zealand | 15:23.6 |
| 8 | Albertina Machado | Portugal | 15:24.4 |
| 9 | Elena Fidatof | Romania | 15:25.3 |
| 10 | Carole Bradford | England | 15:27.5 |
| 11 | Liève Slegers | Belgium | 15:28.3 |
| 12 | Lyudmila Matveyeva | Soviet Union | 15:28.6 |
Full results

Teams
| Rank | Team | Points |
|---|---|---|
| 1st place, gold medalist(s) | England: Zola Budd / 1; Carole Bradford / 10; Ruth Partridge / 20; Jane Shields / 34; (Julie Laughton) / (40) | 65 |
| 2nd place, silver medalist(s) | New Zealand: Christine McMiken / 7; Gail Rear / 18; Mary O'Connor / 19; Wendy Renner / 23; (Sue Bruce) / (32); (Debbie Elsmore) / (33) | 67 |
| 3rd place, bronze medalist(s) | France: Annette Sergent / 3; Martine Fays / 4; Anne Viallix / 26; Jacqueline Lefeuvre / 43; (Maria Lelut) / (44); (Isabelle Matthys) / (70) | 76 |
| 4 | United States | 82 |
| 5 | Portugal | 118 |
| 6 | West Germany | 129 |
| 7 | Soviet Union | 140 |
| 8 | Romania | 140 |
Full results

- Note: Athletes in parentheses did not score for the team result

== Medal table (unofficial) ==
| Rank | Nation | Gold | Silver | Bronze | Total |
|---|---|---|---|---|---|
| 1 | Ethiopia (ETH) | 2 | 2 | 1 | 5 |
| 1 | Kenya (KEN) | 2 | 2 | 1 | 5 |
| 3 | England (ENG) | 2 | 0 | 0 | 2 |
| 4 | United States (USA) | 0 | 1 | 1 | 2 |
| 5 | New Zealand (NZL) | 0 | 1 | 0 | 1 |
| 6 | France (FRA) | 0 | 0 | 2 | 2 |
| 7 | Spain (ESP) | 0 | 0 | 1 | 1 |
| Totals (7 entries) | | 6 | 6 | 6 | 18 |

- Note: Totals include both individual and team medals, with medals in the team competition counting as one medal.

== Participation ==
An unofficial count yields the participation of 670 athletes from 57 countries. This is in agreement with the official numbers as published.

- Algeria (7)
- Australia (20)
- Austria (5)
- Belgium (20)
- Botswana (2)
- Brazil (11)
- Canada (21)
- China (7)
- Chinese Taipei (7)
- Colombia (3)
- Cyprus (8)
- Czechoslovakia (3)
- Denmark (13)
- Djibouti (6)
- Egypt (6)
- England (20)
- Ethiopia (19)
- Finland (10)
- France (21)
- Hong Kong (8)
- Hungary (6)
- India (21)
- Indonesia (4)
- Ireland (21)
- Israel (1)
- Italy (20)
- Jamaica (6)
- Japan (19)
- Kenya (14)
- Kuwait (11)
- Luxembourg (1)
- Malta (8)
- Mauritius (7)
- Morocco (19)
- Netherlands (14)
- New Zealand (14)
- Northern Ireland (18)
- Norway (10)
- Poland (21)
- Portugal (21)
- Puerto Rico (7)
- Romania (5)
- Scotland (21)
- Soviet Union (10)
- Spain (21)
- Sudan (7)
- Sweden (16)
- Switzerland (21)
- Tanzania (1)
- Tunisia (13)
- Turkey (6)
- United States (21)
- U.S. Virgin Islands (3)
- Wales (21)
- West Germany (17)
- Yugoslavia (1)
- Zimbabwe (6)

== See also ==
- 1986 IAAF World Cross Country Championships – Senior men's race
- 1986 IAAF World Cross Country Championships – Junior men's race
- 1986 IAAF World Cross Country Championships – Senior women's race
- 1986 in athletics (track and field)
