= Kipsubai Koskei =

Kenyan former long-distance runner (born 1951)

Medal record

Men's athletics

Representing Kenya

African Championships
Gold medal – first place	1984 Rabat	10,000 m
Silver medal – second place	1985 Cairo	10,000 m
Bronze medal – third place	1984 Rabat	5000 m

IAAF World Cross Country Championships
Bronze medal – third place	1988 Auckland	Senior race

Kipsubai Koskei (born 1 February 1951) is a Kenyan former long-distance runner. His greatest success was a 10,000 metres gold medal at the African Championships in Athletics in 1985, which he won in a championship record time of 28:11.70 minutes. He was bronze medallist in the 5000 metres that same year and returned the following year to win a silver medal in the 10,000 m.

At global level, he appeared three times at the IAAF World Cross Country Championships. He placed 15th on his debut in 1982 then went on to share in the men's team gold medals with Kenya alongside John Ngugi, Joseph Kiptum, Paul Kipkoech, Some Muge and Andrew Masai in 1986, then again in 1988 with Ngugi, Kipkoech, Kiptum, Boniface Merande and Moses Tanui. He was an individual medallist at the 1988 event and was part of a podium sweep of the men's medals behind Ngugi and Kipkoech. This was the first time this had ever happened at the competition, and one Kenyan men would repeat in 1993.

He was a four-time champion at the regional East and Central African Championships, taking his first over 1500 metres in 1977 before taking one 5000 m and two 10,000 m titles in the 1980s.

== International competitions ==
Year	Competition	Venue	Position	Event	Notes
1977	East and Central African Championships	Mogadishu, Somalia	1st	1500 m	3:41.6
1982	World Cross Country Championships	Rome, Italy	15th	Senior race	34:35.1
1982	World Cross Country Championships	Rome, Italy	4th	Senior team	271 pts
1984	African Championships	Rabat, Morocco	3rd	5000 m	13:42.05
1984	African Championships	Rabat, Morocco	1st	10,000 m	28:11.70 CR
1984	East and Central African Championships	Nairobi, Kenya	1st	5000 m	13:50.3
1985	East and Central African Championships	Cairo, Egypt	1st	10,000 m	28:48.36
1985	African Championships	Cairo, Egypt	2nd	10,000 m	28:26.63
1986	World Cross Country Championships	Colombier, Switzerland	7th	Senior race	35:54.8
1986	World Cross Country Championships	Colombier, Switzerland	1st	Senior team	45 pts
1986	East and Central African Championships	Nairobi, Kenya	1st	10,000 m	28:59.1
1988	World Cross Country Championships	Auckland, New Zealand	3rd	Senior race	35:07
1988	World Cross Country Championships	Auckland, New Zealand	1st	Senior team	23 pts

== See also ==
- List of champions of the African Athletics Championships
