= Bekele Debele =

Ethiopian long-distance runner

Medal record

Men's athletics

Representing Ethiopia

World Cross Country Championships
Gold medal – first place	1983 Gateshead	Senior race
Gold medal – first place	1983 Gateshead	Team race
Gold medal – first place	1984 East Rutherford	Team race
Gold medal – first place	1985 Lisbon	Team race
Silver medal – second place	1986 Neuchâtel	Team race
Bronze medal – third place	1987 Warsaw	Team race
Silver medal – second place	1988 Auckland	Team race
Bronze medal – third place	1989 Stavanger	Team race

Bekele Debele (born 12 March 1963)^{[a]} is an Ethiopian former long-distance runner who specialised in cross country running. His greatest achievement was winning the gold medal at the 1983 IAAF World Cross Country Championships, becoming only the second African man to do so.

During his career he was selected for Ethiopia at every edition of the IAAF World Cross Country Championships from 1982 to 1989. He helped win the junior team title in 1982 and shared in the senior team medals from 1983 to 1989, including a three-year undefeated streak for the Ethiopian senior team from 1983 to 1985.

He also competed in the 10,000 metres and represented Ethiopia in that event at the 1983 World Championships in Athletics. He was the bronze medallist on the track at the Friendship Games, having missed the 1984 Summer Olympics due to Ethiopia's boycott of the games.

== Career ==
=== Early life ===
Bekele was born into an Eastern Orthodox family of rural farmers in Shewa and was raised alongside his two brothers and two sisters. He was illiterate for much of his young life. Due to his talent for running he was brought into the national military sports programme, which was typical during the reign of the Derg. There he received a basic education and proper training for long-distance running. Over his career, Bekele was coached by Roba Negussie, a former Olympic sprinter and top Ethiopian coach who served as coach for Ethiopia's Olympic long-distance running team. Bekele made his global debut at the 1982 IAAF World Cross Country Championships. Running in the junior race, he placed tenth and was part of the winning Ethiopian team.

=== World cross country titles ===
He won the San Blas Half Marathon at the start of 1983 with a time of 1:04:40 hours. He emerged as a top level runner shortly afterwards at the 1983 IAAF World Cross Country Championships, narrowly defeating both Carlos Lopes and Some Muge to become the world champion and take the team gold medal with Ethiopia. All three athletes recorded the same time in the closest ever finish at the competition. He became the second African man to win the title after Mohamed Kedir, who won the previous year. Later that year he competed in the 10,000 metres at the inaugural 1983 World Championships in Athletics. He ran a personal best of 27:49.30 minutes in the heats, but was a little slower in the final and placed tenth, just behind his team mate Kedir.

Bekele returned to defend his title at the 1984 IAAF World Cross Country Championships but was beaten on that occasion, placing eighth overall. However, he still led the Ethiopians to the team title. He won the prestigious Cinque Mulini race the following month. He hoped to compete at the 1984 Summer Olympics, but a Soviet-led boycott of the event meant Ethiopia did not send a team there. The eastern bloc countries that boycotted the games set up their own competition instead and Bekele took the 10,000 m bronze medal at the Friendship Games. He ended the year with a win at the São Silvestre de Luanda 10K event.

At the 1985 IAAF World Cross Country Championships he placed fourth behind fellow Ethiopian Wodajo Bulti and helped successfully defend the men's team title. He also continued to compete on the track an took a victory at Moscow's Brothers Znamensky Memorial meet. He repeated his fourth-place finish at the 1986 IAAF World Cross Country Championships. Even though his team mate Abebe Mekonnen was runner-up, the Ethiopian team was outclassed by a strong Kenyan squad, including winner John Ngugi, and was relegated to second in the team rankings.

=== Decline ===
The 1987 edition saw him fare poorly, finishing in 45th place, but he still reached the team podium as Ethiopia took third place. His worst international performance came at the 1988 IAAF World Cross Country Championships: he ended up 83rd overall and finished almost three minutes after world champion Ngugi. He was the slowest competitor in Ethiopia's silver medal-winning team.

At the 1988 Cross de San Sebastián Bekele fought against John Ngugi in a sprint finish, but ended the race as runner-up behind the reigning world champion. This represented a brief improvement of form for what would be his final international outing at the 1989 IAAF World Cross Country Championships. At that event held in Stavanger he finished thirteenth and, alongside Tesfaye Tafa, he lifted Ethiopia into third place in the team competition.

== Notes ==
^{a} In an interview with El País in 1984 Bekele stated (through an interpreter) that his date of birth was 12 April 1962, rather than 12 March 1963 which is found in most other sources.
