= 1987 IAAF World Cross Country Championships =

- Organisers: IAAF
- Edition: 15th
- Date: March 22
- Host city: Warsaw, Poland
- Venue: Służewiec Racecourse
- Events: 3
- Distances: 11.95 km – Senior men 7.05 km – Junior men 5.05 km – Senior women
- Participation: 576 athletes from 47 nations

The 1987 IAAF World Cross Country Championships was held in Warsaw, Poland, at the Służewiec Racecourse on March 22, 1987. A report on the event was given in the Glasgow Herald and in the Evening Times.

Complete results for men, junior men, women, medallists, and the results of British athletes were published.

== Medallists ==
Event	Gold		Silver		Bronze	
Individual
Senior men (11.95 km)	John Ngugi; Kenya	36:07	Paul Kipkoech; Kenya	36:07	Paul Arpin; France	36:51
Junior men (7.05 km)	Wilfred Kirochi; Kenya	22:18	Demeke Bekele; Ethiopia	22:18	Debebe Demisse; Ethiopia	22:20
Senior women (5.05 km)	Annette Sergent; France	16:46	Liz Lynch; Scotland	16:48	Ingrid Kristiansen; Norway	16:51
Team
Senior men	Kenya	53	England	146	Ethiopia	161
Junior men	Ethiopia	19	Kenya	20	Japan	73
Senior women	United States	46	France	50	Soviet Union	55

== Race results ==
=== Senior men's race (11.95 km) ===
Individual race
Rank	Athlete	Country	Time
1st place, gold medalist(s)	John Ngugi	Kenya	36:07
2nd place, silver medalist(s)	Paul Kipkoech	Kenya	36:07
3rd place, bronze medalist(s)	Paul Arpin	France	36:51
4	Abebe Mekonnen	Ethiopia	36:53
5	Some Muge	Kenya	36:54
6	Andrew Masai	Kenya	37:01
7	Pat Porter	United States	37:04
8	Paul McCloy	Canada	37:08
9	Bruno Le Stum	France	37:09
10	Dave Clarke	England	37:10
11	Steve Moneghetti	Australia	37:11
12	Ed Eyestone	United States	37:11
Full results

Teams
Rank	Team	Points
1st place, gold medalist(s)	Kenya: John Ngugi / 1; Paul Kipkoech / 2; Some Muge / 5; Andrew Masai / 6; Moses Tanui / 18; Sisa Kirati / 21; (Boniface Merande) / (48); (Samuel Nyangincha) / (67); (Vincent Kibiwott) / (123)	53
2nd place, silver medalist(s)	England: Dave Clarke / 10; Carl Thackery / 20; Kevin Forster / 22; Steve Binns / 23; Craig Mochrie / 33; Jonathan Richards / 38; (Tim Hutchings) / (43); (Paul Roden) / (46); (Martin McLoughlin) / (59)	146
3rd place, bronze medalist(s)	Ethiopia: Abebe Mekonnen / 4; Haji Bulbula / 17; Wodajo Bulti / 27; Wolde Silasse Melkessa / 29; Melese Feissa / 39; Bekele Debele / 45; (Habte Negash) / (53); (Chala Urgessa) / (70); (Negatu Seyoum) / (96)	161
4	Italy	223
5	France	245
6	Portugal	309
7	Spain	340
8	Belgium	378
Full results

- Note: Athletes in parentheses did not score for the team result

=== Junior men's race (7.05 km) ===
Individual race
Rank	Athlete	Country	Time
1st place, gold medalist(s)	Wilfred Kirochi	Kenya	22:18
2nd place, silver medalist(s)	Demeke Bekele	Ethiopia	22:18
3rd place, bronze medalist(s)	Debebe Demisse	Ethiopia	22:20
4	William Koskei Chemitei	Kenya	22:27
5	Mathew Rono	Kenya	22:28
6	Aligaz Alemayehu	Ethiopia	22:28
7	Simon Mugglestone	England	22:33
8	Bedile Kibret	Ethiopia	22:37
9	Ararse Fuffa	Ethiopia	22:39
10	Thomas Osano	Kenya	22:55
11	Abel Gisemba	Kenya	23:01
12	Haydar Dogan	Turkey	23:07
Full results

Teams
Rank	Team	Points
1st place, gold medalist(s)	Ethiopia: Demeke Bekele / 2; Debebe Demisse / 3; Aligaz Alemayehu / 6; Bedile Kibret / 8; (Ararse Fuffa) / (9); (Tesfayi Dadi) / (63)	19
2nd place, silver medalist(s)	Kenya: Wilfred Kirochi / 1; William Koskei Chemitei / 4; Mathew Rono / 5; Thomas Osano / 10; (Abel Gisemba) / (11); (Joseph Otwori) / (13)	20
3rd place, bronze medalist(s)	Japan: Kenji Ayabe / 14; Yoshinori Yokota / 18; Masaki Yamamoto / 20; Hideyuki Matsumoto / 21; (Riyouki Murakami) / (85); (Yohinori Sato) / (92)	73
4	United States	120
5	Canada	124
6	Spain	125
7	Italy	171
8	Soviet Union	171
Full results

- Note: Athletes in parentheses did not score for the team result

=== Senior women's race (5.05 km) ===
Individual race
Rank	Athlete	Country	Time
1st place, gold medalist(s)	Annette Sergent	France	16:46
2nd place, silver medalist(s)	Liz Lynch	Scotland	16:48
3rd place, bronze medalist(s)	Ingrid Kristiansen	Norway	16:51
4	Lynn Jennings	United States	16:55
5	Lesley Lehane	United States	16:57
6	Mariana Stanescu	Romania	17:04
7	Cornelia Bürki	Switzerland	17:08
8	Krishna Wood	Australia	17:11
9	Paula Ivan	Romania	17:12
10	Natalya Sorokivskaya	Soviet Union	17:13
11	Margaret Wairimu	Kenya	17:14
12	Martine Fays	France	17:19
Full results

Teams
Rank	Team	Points
1st place, gold medalist(s)	United States: Lynn Jennings / 4; Lesley Lehane / 5; Mary Knisely / 14; Janet Smith / 23; (Suzanne Girard) / (44); (Sabrina Dornhoefer) / (53)	46
2nd place, silver medalist(s)	France: Annette Sergent / 1; Martine Fays / 12; Anne Viallix / 18; Maria Lelut / 19; (Patricia Demilly) / (25); (Christine Loiseau) / (128)	50
3rd place, bronze medalist(s)	Soviet Union: Natalya Sorokivskaya / 10; Olga Bondarenko / 13; Yelena Romanova / 15; Marina Rodchenkova / 17; (Svetlana Ulmasova) / (34); (Natalya Lagunkova) / (62)	55
4	Romania	94
5	Kenya	117
6	Norway	143
7	England	152
8	Portugal	159
Full results

- Note: Athletes in parentheses did not score for the team result

== Medal table (unofficial) ==
Rank	Nation	Gold	Silver	Bronze	Total
1	Kenya (KEN)	3	2	0	5
2	Ethiopia (ETH)	1	1	2	4
3	France (FRA)	1	1	1	3
4	United States (USA)	1	0	0	1
5	England (ENG)	0	1	0	1
5	Scotland (SCO)	0	1	0	1
7	Japan (JPN)	0	0	1	1
7	Norway (NOR)	0	0	1	1
7	Soviet Union (URS)	0	0	1	1
Totals (9 entries)		6	6	6	18

- Note: Totals include both individual and team medals, with medals in the team competition counting as one medal.

== Participation ==
An unofficial count yields the participation of 576 athletes from 47 countries. This is in agreement with the official numbers as published.

- Algeria (14)
- Australia (18)
- Belgium (20)
- Brazil (11)
- Bulgaria (5)
- Canada (20)
- China (3)
- Chinese Taipei (7)
- Cuba (2)
- Cyprus (8)
- Czechoslovakia (6)
- Denmark (3)
- Egypt (3)
- England (21)
- Ethiopia (20)
- France (20)
- Greece (9)
- Hong Kong (8)
- Hungary (6)
- India (14)
- Ireland (21)
- Israel (3)
- Italy (21)
- Jamaica (7)
- Japan (19)
- Kenya (21)
- Luxembourg (1)
- Morocco (6)
- Netherlands (7)
- New Zealand (14)
- Northern Ireland (20)
- North Yemen (2)
- Norway (10)
- Poland (20)
- Portugal (15)
- Romania (5)
- Scotland (21)
- Soviet Union (11)
- Spain (21)
- Sweden (21)
- Switzerland (10)
- Tunisia (14)
- Turkey (6)
- United States (20)
- Wales (19)
- West Germany (17)
- Zimbabwe (6)

== See also ==
- 1987 IAAF World Cross Country Championships – Senior men's race
- 1987 IAAF World Cross Country Championships – Junior men's race
- 1987 IAAF World Cross Country Championships – Senior women's race
- 1987 in athletics (track and field)
