= 1988 IAAF World Cross Country Championships =

- Organisers: IAAF
- Edition: 16th
- Date: March 26
- Host city: Auckland, New Zealand
- Venue: Ellerslie Racecourse
- Events: 3
- Distances: 12 km – Senior men 8.031 km – Junior men 5.962 km – Senior women
- Participation: 441 athletes from 41 nations

The 1988 IAAF World Cross Country Championships was held in Auckland, New Zealand, at the Ellerslie Racecourse on March 26, 1988. A report on the event was given in the Glasgow Herald.

Complete results for men, junior men, women, medallists, and the results of British athletes were published.

== Medallists ==
Event	Gold		Silver		Bronze	
Individual
Senior men (12 km)	John Ngugi; Kenya	34:32	Paul Kipkoech; Kenya	34:54	Kipsubai Koskei; Kenya	35:07
Junior men (8.031 km)	Wilfred Kirochi; Kenya	23:25	Alfonce Muindi; Kenya	23:39	Bedile Kibret; Ethiopia	23:41
Senior women (5.962 km)	Ingrid Kristiansen; Norway	19:04	Angela Tooby; United Kingdom	19:23	Annette Sergent; France	19:29
Team
Senior men	Kenya	23	Ethiopia	103	France	134
Junior men	Kenya	12	Ethiopia	33	Spain	61
Senior women	Soviet Union	51	United Kingdom	61	France	72

== Race results ==
=== Senior men's race (12 km) ===
Individual race
Rank	Athlete	Country	Time
1st place, gold medalist(s)	John Ngugi	Kenya	34:32
2nd place, silver medalist(s)	Paul Kipkoech	Kenya	34:54
3rd place, bronze medalist(s)	Kipsubai Koskei	Kenya	35:07
4	Boniface Merande	Kenya	35:22
5	Abebe Mekonnen	Ethiopia	35:25
6	Moses Tanui	Kenya	35:25
7	Joseph Kiptum	Kenya	35:46
8	Kip Rono	Kenya	35:46
9	Some Muge	Kenya	35:48
10	Haji Bulbula	Ethiopia	35:49
11	Paul Arpin	France	35:51
12	Habte Negash	Ethiopia	35:54
Full results

Teams
Rank	Team	Points
1st place, gold medalist(s)	Kenya: John Ngugi / 1; Paul Kipkoech / 2; Kipsubai Koskei / 3; Boniface Merande / 4; Moses Tanui / 6; Joseph Kiptum / 7; (Kip Rono) / (8); (Some Muge) / (9); (Daniel Mutai) / (99)	23
2nd place, silver medalist(s)	Ethiopia: Abebe Mekonnen / 5; Haji Bulbula / 10; Habte Negash / 12; Debebe Demisse / 20; Melese Feissa / 23; Chala Kelele / 33; (Tena Negere) / (38); (Wolde Silasse Melkessa) / (64); (Bekele Debele) / (83)	103
3rd place, bronze medalist(s)	France: Paul Arpin / 11; Steve Tunstall / 14; Jean-Louis Prianon / 17; Joël Lucas / 25; Cyrille Laventure / 30; Bruno Levant / 37; (Thierry Pantel) / (39); (Dominique Delattre) / (56); (Pierre Levisse) / (146)	134
4	United Kingdom	228
5	Italy	272
6	Spain	277
7	United States	285
8	Australia	292
Full results

- Note: Athletes in parentheses did not score for the team result

=== Junior men's race (8.031 km) ===
Individual race^{†}
Rank	Athlete	Country	Time
1st place, gold medalist(s)	Wilfred Kirochi	Kenya	23:25
2nd place, silver medalist(s)	Alfonce Muindi	Kenya	23:39
3rd place, bronze medalist(s)	Bedile Kibret	Ethiopia	23:41
4	Mathew Rono	Kenya	23:51
5	Thomas Makini	Kenya	23:54
6	William Koskei Chemitei	Kenya	24:03
7	Demeke Bekele	Ethiopia	24:17
8	Juan Abad	Spain	24:35
9	Noureddine Morceli	Algeria	24:45
10	Tadelle Abebe	Ethiopia	24:48
11	Zoltán Káldy	Hungary	24:52
12	Andrea Erni	Switzerland	24:56
Full results

^{†}:Cosmas Ndeti of Kenya finished 2nd in 23:31 min, but was disqualified.

Teams
Rank	Team	Points
1st place, gold medalist(s)	Kenya: Wilfred Kirochi / 1; Alfonce Muindi / 2; Mathew Rono / 4; Thomas Makini / 5; (William Koskei Chemitei) / (6)	12
2nd place, silver medalist(s)	Ethiopia: Bedile Kibret / 3; Demeke Bekele / 7; Tadelle Abebe / 10; Lemi Erpassa / 13; (Tesfayi Dadi) / (17)	33
3rd place, bronze medalist(s)	Spain: Juan Abad / 8; Fermín Cacho / 15; Mariano Campal / 16; Jesús Gálvez / 22; (Ricardo Castaño) / (41); (David Pujolar) / (53)	61
4	Japan	83
5	United States	115
6	Australia	128
7	New Zealand	152
8	Algeria	152
Full results

- Note: Athletes in parentheses did not score for the team result

=== Senior women's race (5.962 km) ===
Individual race
Rank	Athlete	Country	Time
1st place, gold medalist(s)	Ingrid Kristiansen	Norway	19:04
2nd place, silver medalist(s)	Angela Tooby	United Kingdom	19:23
3rd place, bronze medalist(s)	Annette Sergent	France	19:29
4	Lynn Jennings	United States	19:38
5	Albertina Machado	Portugal	19:38
6	Yelena Romanova	Soviet Union	19:41
7	Regina Chistyakova	Soviet Union	19:41
8	Liève Slegers	Belgium	19:44
9	Jill Hunter	United Kingdom	19:46
10	Maria Curatolo	Italy	19:46
11	Marie-Pierre Duros	France	19:49
12	Susan Sirma	Kenya	19:50
Full results

Teams
Rank	Team	Points
1st place, gold medalist(s)	Soviet Union: Yelena Romanova / 6; Regina Chistyakova / 7; Marina Rodchenkova / 18; Olga Bondarenko / 20; (Natalya Lagunkova) / (39); (Lyudmila Matveyeva) / (59)	51
2nd place, silver medalist(s)	United Kingdom: Angela Tooby / 2; Jill Hunter / 9; Susan Tooby / 16; Fiona Truman / 34; (Sonia Vinall) / (48); (Laura Wight) / (84)	61
3rd place, bronze medalist(s)	France: Annette Sergent / 3; Marie-Pierre Duros / 11; Patricia Demilly / 28; Rosario Murcia / 30; (Maria Lelut) / (35); (Christine Loiseau) / (75)	72
4	United States	88
5	Canada	91
6	Kenya	122
7	Portugal	126
8	China	152
Full results

- Note: Athletes in parentheses did not score for the team result

== Medal table (unofficial) ==
Rank	Nation	Gold	Silver	Bronze	Total
1	Kenya (KEN)	4	2	1	7
2	Norway (NOR)	1	0	0	1
2	Soviet Union (URS)	1	0	0	1
4	Ethiopia (ETH)	0	2	1	3
5	United Kingdom (UKB)	0	2	0	2
6	France (FRA)	0	0	3	3
7	Spain (ESP)	0	0	1	1
Totals (7 entries)		6	6	6	18

- Note: Totals include both individual and team medals, with medals in the team competition counting as one medal.

== Participation ==
An unofficial count yields the participation of 4401 athletes from 41 countries, two athletes (senior men) less than the official number published.

- Algeria (13)
- Antigua and Barbuda (2)
- Argentina (7)
- Australia (20)
- Austria (1)
- Belgium (10)
- Brazil (11)
- Canada (19)
- China (6)
- Chinese Taipei (5)
- Denmark (10)
- Ethiopia (14)
- Fiji (16)
- Finland (10)
- France (15)
- Hong Kong (6)
- Hungary (1)
- India (14)
- Ireland (18)
- Israel (2)
- Italy (20)
- Japan (20)
- Kenya (21)
- Liechtenstein (1)
- Mauritius (3)
- Nepal (15)
- New Zealand (21)
- Norway (15)
- Poland (2)
- Portugal (16)
- Soviet Union (6)
- Spain (21)
- Sweden (6)
- Switzerland (7)
- United Kingdom (21)
- United States (21)
- Vanuatu (4)
- Western Samoa (4)
- West Germany (11)
- Zambia (4)
- Zimbabwe (2)

== See also ==
- 1988 IAAF World Cross Country Championships – Senior men's race
- 1988 IAAF World Cross Country Championships – Junior men's race
- 1988 IAAF World Cross Country Championships – Senior women's race
- 1988 in athletics (track and field)
