= 1986 IAAF World Cross Country Championships – Junior men's race =

Junior men's race at the 1986 IAAF World Cross Country Championships
- Organisers: IAAF
- Edition: 14th
- Date: March 23
- Host city: Colombier, Neuchâtel, Switzerland
- Venue: Planeyse Colombier
- Events: 1
- Distances: 7.75 km – Junior men
- Participation: 172 athletes from 34 nations

The Junior men's race at the 1986 IAAF World Cross Country Championships was held in Colombier, Neuchâtel, Switzerland, at the Planeyse Colombier on March 23, 1986. A report on the event was given in The Herald and in the Evening Times.

Complete results, medallists, and the results of British athletes were published.

== Race results ==
=== Junior men's race (7.75 km) ===
==== Individual ====
Rank	Athlete	Country	Time
1st place, gold medalist(s)	Melese Feissa	Ethiopia	22:47.6
2nd place, silver medalist(s)	Sammy Bitok	Kenya	22:52.7
3rd place, bronze medalist(s)	Demeke Bekele	Ethiopia	22:56
4	Rafera Workench	Ethiopia	22:57.4
5	Ararse Fuffa	Ethiopia	23:06.1
6	Habte Negash	Ethiopia	23:07.4
7	Brahim Boutayeb	Morocco	23:09.4
8	Alejandro Gómez	Spain	23:17.3
9	William Mutwol	Kenya	23:21.6
10	Peter Rono	Kenya	23:33.7
11	David Onwonga	Kenya	23:35.9
12	José Gruneiro	Spain	23:41.8
13	Anacleto Jiménez	Spain	23:42.4
14	Anthony Ford	Australia	23:51.5
15	Scott Fry	United States	23:54.3
16	Belayneh Tadesse	Ethiopia	23:57.2
17	Andrey Usachov	Soviet Union	24:02.7
18	Mark Dani	United States	24:03.4
19	José Carlos Adán	Spain	24:08.6
20	Eric de Tier	Belgium	24:09.9
21	Jason Agosta	Australia	24:10.8
22	Stephen Spiers	Australia	24:11.3
23	Jan Jonsson	Sweden	24:11.7
24	Chris Borsa	United States	24:12.1
25	Umberto Pusterla	Italy	24:14.7
26	Zoltán Káldy	Hungary	24:16.1
27	Ruddy Walem	Belgium	24:17
28	John Kiptum	Kenya	24:20.1
29	Akira Nakamura	Japan	24:20.6
30	Viktor Shevlyakov	Soviet Union	24:20.9
31	Junichi Takita	Japan	24:21.5
32	Hoche Yayeh	Djibouti	24:22
33	Tahar Benajem	Morocco	24:23
34	Mark Vassallo	Australia	24:23.7
35	John Nuttall	England	24:24.4
36	Raimundo Santos	Portugal	24:25.7
37	Harry Green	United States	24:26.7
38	Yosuke Osawa	Japan	24:27.3
39	Darren Mead	England	24:28.2
40	Omar Abdillahi	Djibouti	24:29
41	Abdelmaleh Amanallah	Morocco	24:29.4
42	Gao Baoxian	China	24:29.8
43	Bouazza Noualla	Algeria	24:30.2
44	Eyob Muller	Netherlands	24:30.9
45	Stephen Connell	Canada	24:31.4
46	Manuel Martín	Spain	24:32.2
47	Reuben Reina	United States	24:32.9
48	József Kovács	Hungary	24:33.6
49	Ulf Petäjä	Sweden	24:34.7
50	Mariano Campal	Spain	24:35.9
51	Mourad Bouldjadj	Algeria	24:36.7
52	David Burke	Ireland	24:37.3
53	José Sobral	Portugal	24:38.6
54	Masanobu Yamaguchi	Japan	24:40.3
55	Stephan Paessens	Belgium	24:41.3
56	Mustapha Aakik	Morocco	24:42.7
57	Gino van Geyte	Belgium	24:43.4
58	Kristofer Prander	Sweden	24:43.7
59	Alastair Russell	Scotland	24:44.3
60	Richard Charette	Canada	24:44.8
61	Robert Carey	Scotland	24:45.3
62	Hamed Hamdouni	Tunisia	24:45.7
63	Greg Webster	Australia	24:46.1
64	Darrell Smith	England	24:46.8
65	Vittorio Di Saverio	Italy	24:47.2
66	Nourredine Kamoun	Tunisia	24:47.7
67	Slim Chérif	Tunisia	24:49.4
68	Khalid Skah	Morocco	24:49.9
69	Richard Birembaux	France	24:50.3
70	Martin Ryan	Ireland	24:50.6
71	Alexander Gunkel	West Germany	24:51
72	Luigi Teodori	Italy	24:51.5
73	Christoph Blum	West Germany	24:51.9
74	Justin Hobbs	Wales	24:54
75	Sándor Barcza	Hungary	24:54.8
76	Greg Whiteley	United States	24:56.6
77	Thierry Bertin	France	24:57.2
78	Bruno Léger	France	24:57.8
79	Rui Viegas	Portugal	24:58.2
80	Rob Whalley	England	24:58.8
81	Steven Halliday	England	25:00.4
82	Azat Rakipov	Soviet Union	25:01
83	John Downes	Ireland	25:01.3
84	Davey Wilson	Northern Ireland	25:01.9
85	Giuliano Baccani	Italy	25:02.3
86	Eike Hugo	West Germany	25:02.8
87	Daniel Hacksteiner	Switzerland	25:04.3
88	Joaquim Figueiredo	Portugal	25:04.7
89	Noui Hadj Nedjai	Algeria	25:05.1
90	Houssein Ahmed Robleh	Djibouti	25:05.5
91	Brahim El Ghazali	Morocco	25:05.9
92	Sebastian Epiney	Switzerland	25:06.7
93	Duan Xiuquan	China	25:08.7
94	Mohamed Idriss Djama	Djibouti	25:10.7
95	Yoshinori Yokota	Japan	25:11.4
96	Luc Peerlinck	Belgium	25:11.7
97	Didier Sainthorand	France	25:12
98	Laredj Behri	Algeria	25:15
99	Paul Williams	Wales	25:16.3
100	Andreas Ahl	Sweden	25:18.5
101	John Gill	Canada	25:19.6
102	Thomas Hearle	Scotland	25:20.6
103	Serge Barrault	France	25:21.1
104	Mads Jacobsen	Denmark	25:21.6
105	Dean Paulin	Australia	25:21.9
106	Henry Klassen	Canada	25:22.2
107	Greg Andersen	Canada	25:24.1
108	Andrew Hollens	England	25:24.8
109	Zdzislaw Wlodarczyk	Poland	25:25.8
110	Karsten Müller	West Germany	25:26.2
111	Károly Vajkovics	Hungary	25:26.7
112	Hiroshi Konno	Japan	25:27.1
113	Eduard Nabunone	Indonesia	25:27.6
114	Mohamed Laouni	Algeria	25:29.6
115	Cairan McGivern	Northern Ireland	25:32
116	Geoffrey Sheehan	Ireland	25:32.8
117	Erik Jylling	Denmark	25:33.8
118	Luca Barzaghi	Italy	25:34.4
119	Tomasz Szablinski	Poland	25:36.1
120	Frank Möller	West Germany	25:36.6
121	Rocco Taminelli	Switzerland	25:38.2
122	Gabriel Nyström	Sweden	25:38.7
123	Marco Di Lieto	Italy	25:39.9
124	Jerzy Kowalski	Poland	25:43.1
125	Tibor Bárdos	Hungary	25:44.7
126	Ivan Horsfall-Turner	Wales	25:46.1
127	Gilbert Dura	France	25:49
128	Christian Riedel	Switzerland	25:49.6
129	Vyacheslav Koshelev	Soviet Union	25:50.2
130	Tom Bessai	Canada	25:50.6
131	Bhim Lal	India	25:50.9
132	Mariusz Lamch	Poland	25:54.7
133	Taoufik Boukrouma	Tunisia	25:55.4
134	Tom Hanlon	Scotland	25:57.4
135	James Bell	Scotland	25:59.3
136	José Dias	Portugal	26:00.6
137	Patrick Hoare	Wales	26:01.2
138	David Wilson	Ireland	26:01.9
139	Daniel Hotz	Switzerland	26:02.9
140	Vinrender Singh	India	26:04.8
141	Naceur Hamed	Tunisia	26:07.2
142	Philippe Hubacher	Switzerland	26:10.4
143	Steve Gibbons	Ireland	26:13.8
144	Omar Daher	Djibouti	26:15.1
145	Arthur Gölly	Austria	26:22.4
146	Werner Edler-Muhr	Austria	26:23.6
147	Kevin Blake	Wales	26:25
148	Ilan Benishti	Israel	26:26.9
149	Luc Krotwaar	Netherlands	26:30.8
150	Róbert Banai	Hungary	26:34.6
151	Justin Reid	Northern Ireland	26:37
152	Nicholas Melling	Wales	26:39.2
153	Adam Mandl	Austria	26:44.5
154	Bernhard Jerovcic	Austria	27:02
155	Declan Caddell	Northern Ireland	27:06.3
156	Amarjetti Singh	India	27:08.2
157	Roland Kloss	Austria	27:17
158	João Lopes	Portugal	27:19.1
159	Gavin Wilson	Northern Ireland	27:20.2
160	Abdul Faisal	Kuwait	27:34
161	Dariusz Krawieci	Poland	27:42
162	Anup Singh	India	27:43.3
163	Meva Lal	India	27:56.4
164	A.Abdullah Honeitem	Kuwait	28:17.9
165	Grzegorz Gajdus	Poland	28:21.7
166	Junnappa	India	28:23.8
167	Egueh Houssein Djama	Djibouti	28:29.7
168	Sayer Hamden	Kuwait	28:45.2
169	Khalid Awad Bassam	Kuwait	28:45.6
170	Ali Sultan Ahmed	Kuwait	28:57.8
171	Abdul Houssein Yousef	Kuwait	29:02.7
—	Paul Mayles	Scotland	DNF

==== Teams ====
Rank	Team	Points
1st place, gold medalist(s)	Ethiopia: Melese Feissa / 1; Demeke Bekele / 3; Rafera Workench / 4; Ararse Fuffa / 5; (Habte Negash) / (6); (Belayneh Tadesse) / (16)	13
2nd place, silver medalist(s)	Kenya: Sammy Bitok / 2; William Mutwol / 9; Peter Rono / 10; David Onwonga / 11; (John Kiptum) / (28)	32
3rd place, bronze medalist(s)	Spain: Alejandro Gómez / 8; José Gruneiro / 12; Anacleto Jiménez / 13; José Carlos Adán / 19; (Manuel Martín) / (46); (Mariano Campal) / (50)	52
4	Australia: Anthony Ford / 14; Jason Agosta / 21; Stephen Spiers / 22; Mark Vassallo / 34; (Greg Webster) / (63); (Dean Paulin) / (105)	91
5	United States: Scott Fry / 15; Mark Dani / 18; Chris Borsa / 24; Harry Green / 37; (Reuben Reina) / (47); (Greg Whiteley) / (76)	94
6	Morocco: Brahim Boutayeb / 7; Tahar Benajem / 33; Abdelmaleh Amanallah / 41; Mustapha Aakik / 56; (Khalid Skah) / (68); (Brahim El Ghazali) / (91)	137
7	Japan: Akira Nakamura / 29; Junichi Takita / 31; Yosuke Osawa / 38; Masanobu Yamaguchi / 54; (Yoshinori Yokota) / (95); (Hiroshi Konno) / (112)	152
8	Belgium: Eric de Tier / 20; Ruddy Walem / 27; Stephan Paessens / 55; Gino van Geyte / 57; (Luc Peerlinck) / (96)	159
9	England: John Nuttall / 35; Darren Mead / 39; Darrell Smith / 64; Rob Whalley / 80; (Steven Halliday) / (81); (Andrew Hollens) / (108)	218
10	Sweden: Jan Jonsson / 23; Ulf Petäjä / 49; Kristofer Prander / 58; Andreas Ahl / 100; (Gabriel Nyström) / (122)	230
11	Italy: Umberto Pusterla / 25; Vittorio Di Saverio / 65; Luigi Teodori / 72; Giuliano Baccani / 85; (Luca Barzaghi) / (118); (Marco Di Lieto) / (123)	247
12	Portugal: Raimundo Santos / 36; José Sobral / 53; Rui Viegas / 79; Joaquim Figueiredo / 88; (José Dias) / (136); (João Lopes) / (158)	256
13	Djibouti: Hoche Yayeh / 32; Omar Abdillahi / 40; Houssein Ahmed Robleh / 90; Mohamed Idriss Djama / 94; (Omar Daher) / (144); (Egueh Houssein Djama) / (167)	256
14	Soviet Union: Andrey Usachov / 17; Viktor Shevlyakov / 30; Azat Rakipov / 82; Vyacheslav Koshelev / 129	258
15	Hungary: Zoltán Káldy / 26; József Kovács / 48; Sándor Barcza / 75; Károly Vajkovics / 111; (Tibor Bárdos) / (125); (Róbert Banai) / (150)	260
16	Algeria: Bouazza Noualla / 43; Mourad Bouldjadj / 51; Noui Hadj Nedjai / 89; Laredj Behri / 98; (Mohamed Laouni) / (114)	281
17	Canada: Stephen Connell / 45; Richard Charette / 60; John Gill / 101; Henry Klassen / 106; (Greg Andersen) / (107); (Tom Bessai) / (130)	312
18	France: Richard Birembaux / 69; Thierry Bertin / 77; Bruno Léger / 78; Didier Sainthorand / 97; (Serge Barrault) / (103); (Gilbert Dura) / (127)	321
19	Ireland: David Burke / 52; Martin Ryan / 70; John Downes / 83; Geoffrey Sheehan / 116; (David Wilson) / (138); (Steve Gibbons) / (143)	321
20	Tunisia: Hamed Hamdouni / 62; Nourredine Kamoun / 66; Slim Chérif / 67; Taoufik Boukrouma / 133; (Naceur Hamed) / (141)	328
21	West Germany: Alexander Gunkel / 71; Christoph Blum / 73; Eike Hugo / 86; Karsten Müller / 110; (Frank Möller) / (120)	340
22	Scotland: Alastair Russell / 59; Robert Carey / 61; Thomas Hearle / 102; Tom Hanlon / 134; (James Bell) / (135); (Paul Mayles) / (DNF)	356
23	Switzerland: Daniel Hacksteiner / 87; Sebastian Epiney / 92; Rocco Taminelli / 121; Christian Riedel / 128; (Daniel Hotz) / (139); (Philippe Hubacher) / (142)	428
24	Wales: Justin Hobbs / 74; Paul Williams / 99; Ivan Horsfall-Turner / 126; Patrick Hoare / 137; (Kevin Blake) / (147); (Nicholas Melling) / (152)	436
25	Poland: Zdzislaw Wlodarczyk / 109; Tomasz Szablinski / 119; Jerzy Kowalski / 124; Mariusz Lamch / 132; (Dariusz Krawieci) / (161); (Grzegorz Gajdus) / (165)	484
26	Northern Ireland: Davey Wilson / 84; Cairan McGivern / 115; Justin Reid / 151; Declan Caddell / 155; (Gavin Wilson) / (159)	505
27	India: Bhim Lal / 131; Vinrender Singh / 140; Amarjetti Singh / 156; Anup Singh / 162; (Meva Lal) / (163); (Junnappa) / (166)	589
28	Austria: Arthur Gölly / 145; Werner Edler-Muhr / 146; Adam Mandl / 153; Bernhard Jerovcic / 154; (Roland Kloss) / (157)	598
29	Kuwait: Abdul Faisal / 160; A.Abdullah Honeitem / 164; Sayer Hamden / 168; Khalid Awad Bassam / 169; (Ali Sultan Ahmed) / (170); (Abdul Houssein Yousef) / (171)	661

- Note: Athletes in parentheses did not score for the team result

== Participation ==
An unofficial count yields the participation of 172 athletes from 34 countries in the Junior men's race, one athlete less than the official number published.

- Algeria (5)
- Australia (6)
- Austria (5)
- Belgium (5)
- Canada (6)
- China (2)
- Denmark (2)
- Djibouti (6)
- England (6)
- Ethiopia (6)
- France (6)
- Hungary (6)
- India (6)
- Indonesia (1)
- Ireland (6)
- Israel (1)
- Italy (6)
- Japan (6)
- Kenya (5)
- Kuwait (6)
- Morocco (6)
- Netherlands (2)
- Northern Ireland (5)
- Poland (6)
- Portugal (6)
- Scotland (6)
- Soviet Union (4)
- Spain (6)
- Sweden (5)
- Switzerland (6)
- Tunisia (5)
- United States (6)
- Wales (6)
- West Germany (5)

== See also ==
- 1986 IAAF World Cross Country Championships – Senior men's race
- 1986 IAAF World Cross Country Championships – Senior women's race
