= Alejandro Gómez (runner) =

Spanish long-distance runner (1967–2021)

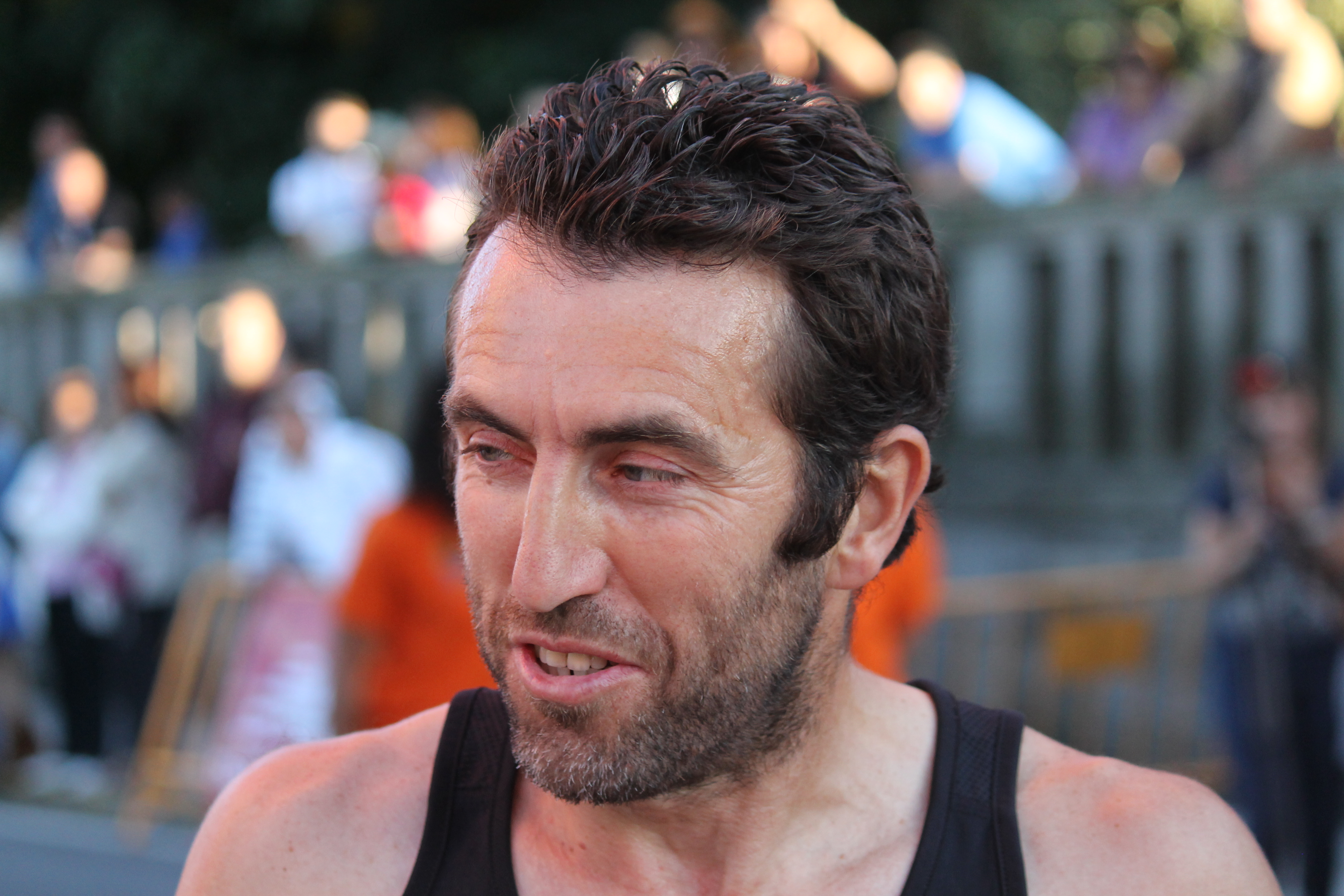
Alejandro Gómez Cabral in 2012

Alejandro Gómez Cabral (11 April 1967 – 31 January 2021) was a Spanish long-distance runner who specialized in the marathon and cross-country running.

== Life ==
Cabral was born on 11 April 1967 in Vigo.

== Career ==
He stood out from a very young age, he was a Spanish junior record holder of 5,000 m (14:16.7), a promise of 10,000 m (27:54.13) and a junior of 2,000 m (5:09.5), 5,000 m (13:42.17) and 3,000 m obstacles (8:36.4).

He was also champion of Spain of cross country in the youth category in 1984, of 5,000 m and cross country in the promises category in 1986, 1987 and 1988 and of 3,000 m obstacles in 1987. In absolute category he was several times champion of Spain of 10,000m., Half marathon, and cross. In the international field, he participated in the Olympic Games in Seoul 1988 in the 5000 m, in Barcelona 1992 and in Atlanta 1996 in the 10,000 m event, where he was 15th in the final with a mark of 29: 38.11. At the 1991 World Athletics Championships in Tokyo he was 9th in the 10,000m final with a time of 28: 13.71.

At the 1995 World Athletics Championships held in Gothenburg he was 16th in 10,000 m and at the 1999 World Athletics Championships held in Seville he ranked 40th in marathon. The two times he was closest to a podium were in the marathons of the 1998 European Athletics Championships held in Budapest and in the 2002 European Athletics Championships held in Munich where he was 5th and 6th respectively. He participated many times in the cross-country world championship, and achieved third place in teams in 1989. In the European Championship he won silver in the second edition held in Alnwick in 1995 where he was proclaimed the European team champion. He also participated in several editions of the World Half Marathon, achieving an 8th place in Palma de Mallorca, his best performance, where he was runner-up for teams with the national team. As a member of the Spanish marathon team that stood out so much at the end of the nineties, he was runner-up in the European Cup in 1998, and was also the distance record holder, a mark that he snatched from Martín Fiz in 1997 with a second place in the Rotterdam marathon with a mark of 2:07:54.

In June 2020, an inoperable brain tumor was detected and he died on 31 January 2021.

== Achievements ==
Year	Competition	Venue	Position	Event	Notes
Representing Spain
1985	European Junior Championships	Cottbus, East Germany	13th	3000 m	8:18.42
1985	World Cross Country Championships	Lisbon, Portugal	16th	Junior race	23:30
1986	World Junior Championships	Athens, Greece	2nd	5000 m	13:55.94
1986	World Cross Country Championships	Neuchâtel, Switzerland	8th	Junior race	23:17
1987	World Cross Country Championships	Warsaw, Poland	114th	Long race	38:48
1988	World Cross Country Championships	Auckland, New Zealand	24th	Long race	36:24
1989	World Cross Country Championships	Stavanger, Norway	6th	Long race	40:29
1989	World Cross Country Championships	Stavanger, Norway	5th	Team	189 pts
1990	World Cross Country Championships	Aix-les-Bains, France	32rd	Senior race (12.2 km)	35:24
1990	World Cross Country Championships	Aix-les-Bains, France	3rd	Team	176 pts
1990	European Championships	Split, Yugoslavia	10th	10,000m	28:16.06
1991	World Cross Country Championships	Antwerp, Belgium	14th	Long race (11.764 km)	34:36
1991	World Cross Country Championships	Antwerp, Belgium	3rd	Team	198 pts
1992	World Half Marathon Championships	Newcastle upon Tyne, United Kingdom	9th	Half marathon	1:01:20
1995	World Cross Country Championships	Durham, England	28th	Senior race (12.02 km)	35:30
1995	World Cross Country Championships	Durham, England	3rd	Team	120 pts
1996	Olympic Games	Atlanta, United States	15th	10,000 m	28:39.11
1996	World Half Marathon Championships	Palma de Mallorca, Spain	8th	Half marathon	1:02:47
1996	World Half Marathon Championships	Palma de Mallorca, Spain	2nd	Team	3:08:36
1998	European Championships	Budapest, Hungary	5th	Marathon	2:13:23
1999	World Championships	Seville, Spain	40th	Marathon	2:26:40
2002	European Championships	Munich, Germany	6th	Marathon	2:13:40
2003	World Championships	Paris, France	—	Marathon	DNF

=== Personal bests ===
- 1500 metres - 3:39.18 min (1991)
- 3000 metres - 7:47.7 min (1989)
- 3000 metres steeplechase - 8:33.6 min (1989)
- 5000 metres - 13:20.91 min (1989)
- 10,000 metres - 27:39.38 min (1993)
- Half marathon - 1:01:20 hrs (1992)
- Marathon - 2:07:54 hrs (1997)
