= 1983 IAAF World Cross Country Championships =

- Organisers: IAAF
- Edition: 11th
- Date: 20 March
- Host city: Gateshead, Tyne and Wear, England
- Venue: Riverside Park
- Events: 3
- Distances: 11.994 km – Senior men 8.033 km – Junior men 4.072 km – Senior women
- Participation: 431 athletes from 35 nations

The 1983 IAAF World Cross Country Championships was held in Gateshead, England, at the Riverside Park on 20 March 1983. A report on the event was given in the Glasgow Herald and in the Evening Times.

Complete results for men, junior men, women, medallists, and the results of British athletes were published.

== Medallists ==
Event	Gold		Silver		Bronze	
Individual
Senior men (11.994 km)	Bekele Debele; Ethiopia	36:52	Carlos Lopes; Portugal	36:52	Some Muge; Kenya	36:52
Junior men (8.033 km)	Fesseha Abebe; Ethiopia	24:58	Angaso Telega; Ethiopia	24:59	Jonathan Richards; England	25:07
Senior women (4.072 km)	Grete Waitz; Norway	13:29	Alison Wiley; Canada	13:37	Tatyana Pozdnyakova; Soviet Union	13:37
Team
Senior men	Ethiopia	104	United States	170	Kenya	191
Junior men	Ethiopia	13	Spain	41	England	58
Senior women	United States	31	Soviet Union	41	Canada	53

== Race results ==
=== Senior men's race (11.994 km) ===
Individual race
Rank	Athlete	Country	Time
1st place, gold medalist(s)	Bekele Debele	Ethiopia	36:52
2nd place, silver medalist(s)	Carlos Lopes	Portugal	36:52
3rd place, bronze medalist(s)	Some Muge	Kenya	36:52
4	Alberto Salazar	United States	36:53
5	Antonio Prieto	Spain	36:56
6	Rob de Castella	Australia	37:00
7	Dave Clarke	England	37:05
8	Ezequiel Canario	Portugal	37:10
9	Pat Porter	United States	37:12
10	Alberto Cova	Italy	37:17
11	Nat Muir	Scotland	37:24
12	Mehmet Yürdadön	Turkey	37:24
Full results

Teams
Rank	Team	Points
1st place, gold medalist(s)	Ethiopia: Bekele Debele / 1; Eshetu Tura / 14; Wodajo Bulti / 20; Mohammed Kedir / 22; Adugna Lema / 23; Chala Urgessa / 24; (Dejene Beyene) / (50); (Girma Berhanu) / (58); (Miruts Yifter) / (67)	104
2nd place, silver medalist(s)	United States: Alberto Salazar / 4; Pat Porter / 9; Thom Hunt / 28; Ed Eyestone / 30; Craig Virgin / 42; Mark Anderson / 57; (Doug Brown) / (118); (Bill Donakowski) / (147); (John Idstrom) / (160)	170
3rd place, bronze medalist(s)	Kenya: Some Muge / 3; Paul Kipkoech / 16; Joshua Kipkemboi / 31; James Kipngetich / 32; Jackson Ruto / 37; Herman Kipngetich / 72; (Sisa Kirati) / (83); (Dominic Wambua) / (91); (Joseph Otieno) / (139)	191
4	Australia	193
5	Spain	206
6	Portugal	302
7	Italy	306
8	England	318
Full results

- Note: Athletes in parentheses did not score for the team result

=== Junior men's race (8.033 km) ===
Individual race
Rank	Athlete	Country	Time
1st place, gold medalist(s)	Fesseha Abebe	Ethiopia	24:58
2nd place, silver medalist(s)	Angaso Telega	Ethiopia	24:59
3rd place, bronze medalist(s)	Jonathan Richards	England	25:07
4	Gonfa Negere	Ethiopia	25:22
5	José Manuel Albentosa	Spain	25:35
6	Teka Mekonnen	Ethiopia	25:40
7	Cyrille Laventure	France	25:51
8	Marc Olesen	Canada	25:53
9	Asfaw Tadesse	Ethiopia	25:57
10	Richard Carter	England	26:06
11	José Manuel García	Spain	26:10
12	Antonio Pérez	Spain	26:15
Full results

Teams
Rank	Team	Points
1st place, gold medalist(s)	Ethiopia: Fesseha Abebe / 1; Angaso Telega / 2; Gonfa Negere / 4; Teka Mekonnen / 6; (Asfaw Tadesse) / (9); (Disso Dissessa) / (16)	13
2nd place, silver medalist(s)	Spain: José Manuel Albentosa / 5; José Manuel García / 11; Antonio Pérez / 12; José Zabaleta / 13; (Joseba Sarriegui) / (15); (Alfredo Munoz) / (17)	41
3rd place, bronze medalist(s)	England: Jonathan Richards / 3; Richard Carter / 10; Clifton Bradeley / 20; Phil Makepeace / 25; (Paul Taylor) / (39); (Martin Vile) / (55)	58
4	Canada	107
5	Tunisia	139
6	United States	145
7	Portugal	151
8	Italy	166
Full results

- Note: Athletes in parentheses did not score for the team result

=== Senior women's race (4.072 km) ===
Individual race
Rank	Athlete	Country	Time
1st place, gold medalist(s)	Grete Waitz	Norway	13:29
2nd place, silver medalist(s)	Alison Wiley	Canada	13:37
3rd place, bronze medalist(s)	Tatyana Pozdnyakova	Soviet Union	13:37
4	Joan Benoit	United States	13:57
5	Betty Springs	United States	14:00
6	Svetlana Ulmasova	Soviet Union	14:01
7	Francine Peeters	Belgium	14:03
8	Fiţa Lovin	Romania	14:04
9	Margaret Groos	United States	14:04
10	Aurora Cunha	Portugal	14:06
11	Alla Yushina	Soviet Union	14:08
12	Nancy Rooks	Canada	14:09
Full results

Teams
Rank	Team	Points
1st place, gold medalist(s)	United States: Joan Benoit / 4; Betty Springs / 5; Margaret Groos / 9; Jan Merrill / 13; (Nan Doak) / (40); (Kathy Hadler) / (42)	31
2nd place, silver medalist(s)	Soviet Union: Tatyana Pozdnyakova / 3; Svetlana Ulmasova / 6; Alla Yushina / 11; Yelena Sipatova / 21; (Lyudmila Medvedeva) / (64); (Alla Libutina) / (DNF)	41
3rd place, bronze medalist(s)	Canada: Alison Wiley / 2; Nancy Rooks / 12; Anne-Marie Malone / 16; Lynn Kanuka / 23; (Wendy van Mierlo) / (37); (Lizanne Bussières) / (45)	53
4	England	94
5	Romania	98
6	New Zealand	122
7	Portugal	122
8	Norway	149
Full results

- Note: Athletes in parentheses did not score for the team result

== Medal table (unofficial) ==
Rank	Nation	Gold	Silver	Bronze	Total
1	Ethiopia (ETH)	4	1	0	5
2	United States (USA)	1	1	0	2
3	Norway (NOR)	1	0	0	1
4	Canada (CAN)	0	1	1	2
4	Soviet Union (URS)	0	1	1	2
6	Portugal (POR)	0	1	0	1
6	Spain (ESP)	0	1	0	1
8	Kenya (KEN)	0	0	2	2
Totals (8 entries)		6	6	4	16

- Note: Totals include both individual and team medals, with medals in the team competition counting as one medal.

== Participation ==
An unofficial count yields the participation of 431 athletes from 35 countries, one senior man athlete less than the official number published.

- Algeria (13)
- Australia (14)
- Belgium (18)
- Canada (20)
- China (6)
- Chinese Taipei (2)
- Comoros (1)
- Denmark (8)
- Djibouti (3)
- England (20)
- Ethiopia (15)
- France (21)
- Ireland (20)
- Israel (4)
- Italy (17)
- Kenya (9)
- Kuwait (5)
- Morocco (6)
- Netherlands (14)
- New Zealand (15)
- Northern Ireland (20)
- Norway (11)
- Palestine (1)
- Portugal (21)
- Romania (5)
- Scotland (21)
- Soviet Union (11)
- Spain (21)
- Sweden (15)
- Switzerland (8)
- Tunisia (11)
- Turkey (6)
- United States (21)
- Wales (21)
- West Germany (7)

== See also ==
- 1983 IAAF World Cross Country Championships – Senior men's race
- 1983 IAAF World Cross Country Championships – Junior men's race
- 1983 IAAF World Cross Country Championships – Senior women's race
- 1983 in athletics (track and field)
