= Demilly =

Demilly is a surname. Notable people with the surname include:

- Patricia Demilly (born 1959), French middle-distance runner
- Stéphane Demilly, French politician
