= Ahmed Salah =

Ahmed Salah may refer to:

- Hussein Ahmed Salah (born 1956), Olympic runner from Djibouti
- Ahmed Salah Alwan (born 1982), Iraqi footballer
- Ahmed Adam Salah (born 1966), Sudanese Olympic runner
- Ahmed Salah (badminton) (born 1990), Egyptian badminton player
- Ahmed Salah (volleyball) (born 1984), Egyptian volleyball player
- Ahmed Gaid Salah (1940–2019), Algerian army officer
- Ahmed Salah Abdou born 1986, Egyptian swimmer
- Ahmed Salah (Egypt), activist, co-founder of Kefaya
