= Roy Anderson =

Roy Anderson, Andersen or Andersson may refer to:

== Sports ==
- Roy Anderson (American football) (born 1980), American football coach
- Roy Anderson (ice hockey) in 1910 NHA season
- Roy Anderson (baseball); see Clyde Engle
- Roy Andersson (footballer) (born 1949), footballer from Sweden
- Roy Andersen (born 1955), runner

== Others ==
- Sir Roy M. Anderson (born 1947), British scientist
- Roy Anderson (The Office), character from television sitcom The Office
- Roy Andersson (born 1943), Swedish film director
- Roy Andersen (general) (born 1948), South African businessman and military officer
- Roy Anderson (aviation executive); see Navy Supply Corps
