= Ahmed Adam =

Ahmed Adam is the name of

- Ahmed Adam Salah (born 1966), Sudanese marathon runner
- Ahmed Adam (swimmer) (born 1987), Sudanese swimmer
