= Joseph Kiptum =

Kenyan former long-distance runner (born 1956)

Medal record

Men's athletics

Representing Kenya

IAAF World Cross Country Championships
Bronze medal – third place	1986 Neuchâtel	Senior race

Joseph Kiptum (born 1956) is a Kenyan former long-distance runner. He was a frequent participant at the IAAF World Cross Country Championships for Kenya in the 1980s and made a total of seven appearances in the senior race from 1981 to 1990.

His best finish at the competition was third at the 1986 IAAF World Cross Country Championships, finishing behind teammate John Ngugi and Abebe Mekonnen. He was a point-scoring member of the Kenyan team on four occasions and shared in three-team titles with the Kenyan men in 1986, 1988, and 1989.

He was a one-time Kenyan champion on the track, winning the 10,000 metres in 1987.

== International competitions ==
Year	Competition	Venue	Position	Event	Notes
1981	World Cross Country Championships	Madrid, Spain	68th	Senior race	36:30
1982	World Cross Country Championships	Rome, Italy	38th	Senior race	34:58.9
1982	World Cross Country Championships	Rome, Italy	4th	Senior team	271 pts
1984	World Cross Country Championships	East Rutherford, United States	63rd	Senior race	34:43
1986	World Cross Country Championships	Neuchâtel, Switzerland	3rd	Senior race	35:39.8
1986	World Cross Country Championships	Neuchâtel, Switzerland	1st	Senior team	45 pts
1988	World Cross Country Championships	Auckland, New Zealand	7th	Senior race	35:46
1988	World Cross Country Championships	Auckland, New Zealand	1st	Senior team	23 pts
1989	World Cross Country Championships	Stavanger, Norway	16th	Senior race	40:57
1989	World Cross Country Championships	Stavanger, Norway	1st	Senior team	44 pts
1990	World Cross Country Championships	Aix-les-Bains, France	22nd	Senior race	35:16

== National titles ==
- Kenyan Athletics Championships
  - 10,000 metres: 1987
