= Pat Porter =

American long-distance runner

Personal information
- Full name: Patrick Ralph Porter
- Born: May 31, 1959 Wadena, Minnesota, U.S.
- Died: July 26, 2012 (aged 53) Sedona, Arizona, U.S.
- Height: 6 ft 0 in (183 cm)
- Weight: 132 lb (60 kg)

Sport
- Sport: Track, Long-distance running
- Events: 5,000 meters, 10,000 meters
- College team: Adams State

Achievements and titles
- Personal bests: 3000m: 7:51.0; 5000m: 13:33.91; 10,000m: 27:46.80
Medal record
Men's athletics
Representing the United States
IAAF World Cup
Silver medal – second place	1985 Canberra	10,000 m
IAAF World Cross Country Championships
Silver medal – second place	1983 Gateshead	Team Long Race
Silver medal – second place	1984 East Rutherford	Team Long Race
Bronze medal – third place	1985 Lisbon	Team Long Race
Bronze medal – third place	1986 Colombier	Team Long Race
Summer Universiade
Bronze medal – third place	1987 Zagreb	10,000 m

Patrick Ralph Porter (May 31, 1959 – July 26, 2012) was an American distance runner. Born in Wadena, Minnesota, he graduated from Adams State in 1982 with a degree in marketing, after which he became one of the most dominant U.S. distance runners of the 1980s. Porter was a two time U.S. Olympian, running the 10000 meters at the 1984 and 1988 Olympic Games. In 1983 he set the World Record for a road 10K at 27:31.8. He won the silver medal at the 1985 IAAF World Cup in Canberra, Australia, getting nipped at the tape by Ethiopia's Wodajo Bulti by six hundredths of a second.

== Running career ==
=== Early career ===
Porter had a personal record of 4:29 in the mile while running for Evergreen High School in Evergreen, Colorado. He was not heavily recruited to run in college. He is a 1982 alumnus Adams State College in Alamosa, Colorado, and flourished under the training of coach Joe Vigil. At Adams State, Porter won 6 RMAC championships, and 3 national NAIA championships.

=== Post collegiate ===
Porter was best known for his cross country running accomplishments. He won a record eight consecutive USA Cross Country Championships from 1982 to 1989. Porter also represented the United States at the World Cross Country Championships each of these years. His best finish at the World Championships was 4th in 1984, followed by 6th, 7th, 9th and 10th-place finishes throughout his career.

1984
Porter finished 15th in 28:34.59 at the Athletics at the 1984 Summer Olympics - 10000 metres.

1988
Porter did not advance to the Athletics at the 1988 Summer Olympics - 10000 metres final after finishing 11th in 28:45.04 in the 1st round, ranking him 23rd in the Olympics that year, but only 20 qualified to the final. His time would have ranked 17th as several runners ran slower in the final, still almost 1:25 (almost a lap and a half) behind the winner.

In 1998 Porter played Finnish distance runner Lasse Virén in Without Limits, a biographical film about American distance legend Steve Prefontaine. He was married to fellow U.S. 1988 Olympic Team member high jumper Trish King.

== Honor ==
Porter was inducted in the National Association of Intercollegiate Athletics Hall of Fame in 1987. Porter was inducted in the RMAC Hall of Fame in July 2012. Only days before his death, on July 20, Porter had been inducted into the Rocky Mountain Athletic Conference Hall of Fame in Colorado Springs and was also inducted into the Adams State Athletics Hall of Fame in 2000 in Alamosa, Colorado.

== Death ==
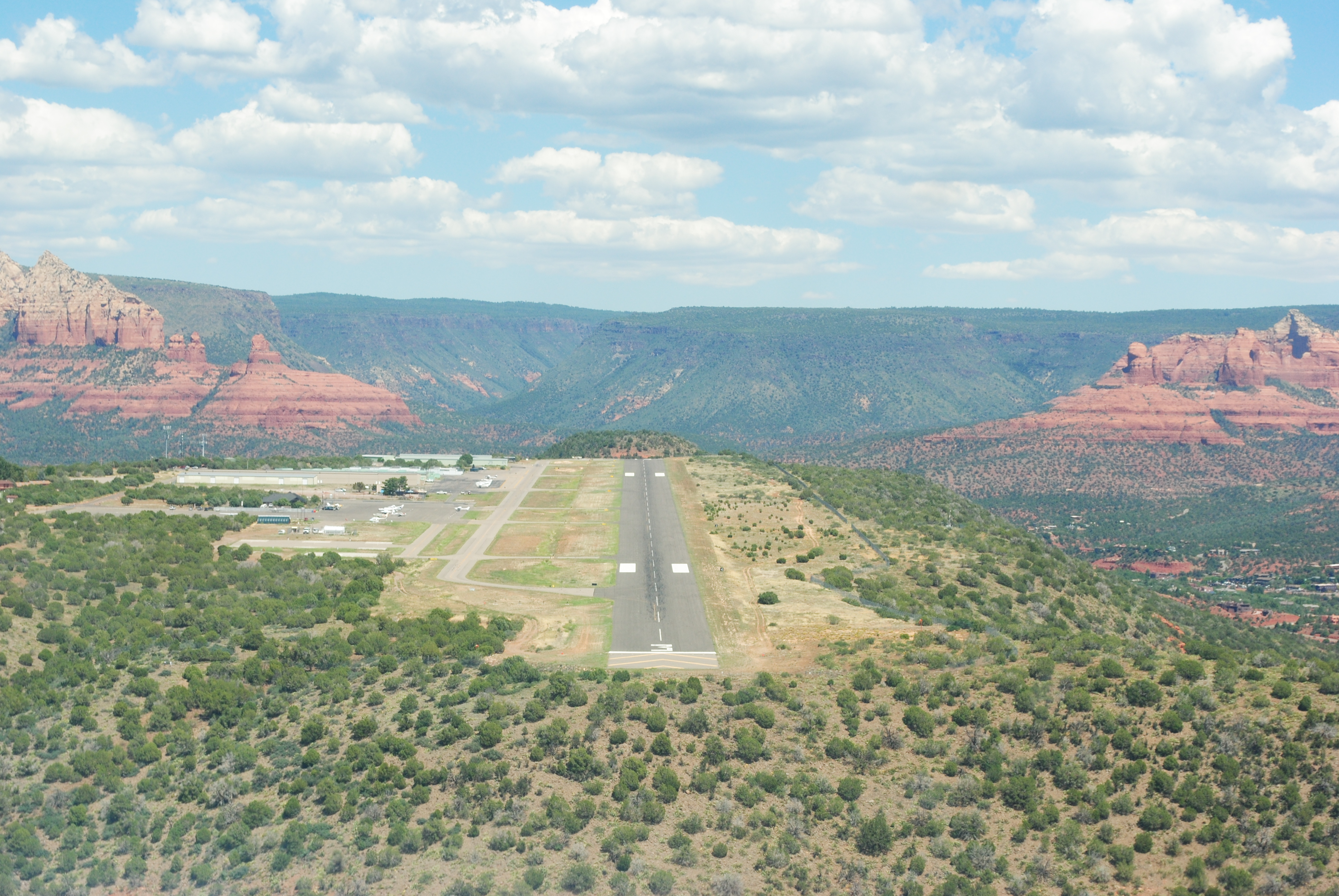
Porter's plane departed runway 21 and crashed shortly after exiting the mesa

On July 26, 2012, at approximately 8:30 a.m., Porter was killed in an airplane crash along with his 15-year-old son Connor and his son's friend, 14-year-old Connor Mantsch. Porter, an avid pilot, on takeoff hit a boundary fence at the southbound end of the Sedona Airport runway in Sedona, Arizona, then went down a steep mesa and burst into flames upon impact at the bottom of the hill. He was 53 years old.

== Competition record ==
=== Cross country ===
Year	Competition	Venue	Position	Event	Notes
Representing the United States
1982	World Cross Country Championships	Rome, Italy	64th	12 km	35:23
1983	World Cross Country Championships	Gateshead, England	9th	12 km	37:12
1984	World Cross Country Championships	New York City, United States	4th	11.8 km	33:34
1985	World Cross Country Championships	Lisbon, Portugal	12th	12 km	34:02
1986	World Cross Country Championships	Neuchatel, Switzerland	6th	12 km	35:48
1987	World Cross Country Championships	Warsaw, Poland	7th	12 km	37:04
1988	World Cross Country Championships	Auckland, New Zealand	28th	12 km	36:26
1989	World Cross Country Championships	Stavanger, Norway	31st	12 km	41:31
1991	World Cross Country Championships	Antwerp, Belgium	68th	12 km	35:29

=== Track and field ===
Year	Competition	Venue	Position	Event	Notes
Representing the United States
1982	USA Outdoor Track and Field Championships	Knoxville, Tennessee	6th	10,000 m	28:48.8
1983	USA Outdoor Track and Field Championships	Indianapolis, Indiana	5th	10,000 m	28:35.92
1984	US Olympic Trials	Los Angeles, California	3rd	10,000 m	28:03.86
1984	Olympic Games	Los Angeles, United States	15th	10,000 m	28:34.59
1985	USA Outdoor Track and Field Championships	Indianapolis, Indiana	3rd	10,000 m	28:12.9
1985	World Cup	Canberra, Australia	2nd	10,000 m	29:23.02
1987	USA Outdoor Track and Field Championships	San Jose, California	4th	10,000 m	28:29.7
1988	US Olympic Trials	Indianapolis, Indiana	3rd	10,000 m	29:09.92
1988	Olympic Games	Seoul, South Korea	heats	10,000 m	28:45.04
1989	USA Outdoor Track and Field Championships	Houston, Texas	1st	10,000 m	28:45.78
1990	USA Outdoor Track and Field Championships	Norwalk, California	7th	10,000 m	28:38.99
1991	USA Outdoor Track and Field Championships	New York, New York	5th	10,000 m	28:26.49
1992	US Olympic Trials	New Orleans, Louisiana	6th	10,000 m	28:54.6
1994	USA Outdoor Track and Field Championships	Knoxville, Tennessee	6th	10,000 m	29:24.05
