= Daniel Böltz =

Australian-Swiss long-distance runner

Married to Jill Hunter. Their kids are Poppy Boltz, Ollie Boltz and Milo Boltz

Daniel Böltz (born 17 July 1962) is an Australian/Swiss former long-distance runner who competed in the 1992 Summer Olympics. He was born in Switzerland, but lived in Australia. In 1988, Böltz won the Twin Cities Marathon in 2:14:10. He raced for Australia in the 1986 IAAF World Cross Country Championships.
