= Lynn Jennings =

American long-distance runner

Personal information
- Full name: Lynn Alice Jennings
- Born: July 1, 1960 (age 66) Princeton, New Jersey, U.S.
Medal record
Women's athletics
Representing United States
Olympic Games
Bronze medal – third place	1992 Barcelona	10,000 metres
World Indoor Championships
Silver medal – second place	1995 Barcelona	3000 metres
Bronze medal – third place	1993 Toronto	3000 metres
World Cross Country Championships
Gold medal – first place	1990 Aix-les-Bains	Women's race
Gold medal – first place	1991 Antwerp	Women's race
Gold medal – first place	1992 Boston	Women's race
Silver medal – second place	1986 Neuchâtel	Women's race
Bronze medal – third place	1993 Amorebieta	Women's race

Lynn Alice Jennings (born July 1, 1960) is a retired American long-distance runner. She is one of the best female American runners of all time, with a range from 1500 meters to the marathon. She excelled at all three of the sport's major disciplines: track, road, and cross country. She won the bronze in the Women's 10,000 metres at the 1992 Barcelona Olympics. She set a world indoor record in the 5000 meter run in 1990.

She is a nine-time champion of the USA Cross Country Championships and won the IAAF World Cross Country Championships three times consecutively from 1990 to 1992. Only two other women (Norway's Grete Waitz and Kenya's Edith Masai) have achieved this feat.

== Career ==
Born in Princeton, New Jersey, Jennings attended the Bromfield school in Harvard, Massachusetts. She ran on the boys' cross country team, as there was no girls' team at the time. Jennings won the U.S. National Cross Country Championship nine times. She ran the Boston Marathon unofficially in 1978 and finished in 2:46, a time which would have placed third in the open women's division and a record for her age group '. Graduating in Harvard, MA, in 1978, she left behind countless records, including the national high school indoor 1500-meters run.

Jennings attended Princeton University and graduated with an A.B. in history in 1983 after completing a 93-page long senior thesis titled "The Harvard Shakers: A Study of the Rise and Decline of a Community." Despite numerous college running titles, she left the university "unsatisified" with her performance. She failed to qualify for the 1984 Olympics, but was the bronze medalist at 10,000 meters in the 1992 Summer Olympics, held in Barcelona, Spain. Her time of 31:19.89 was a new American record, and it lasted until May 3, 2002, when it was broken by Deena Kastor in Palo Alto, California.

She won the World Cross Country Championships in 1990, 1991, and 1992. The 1992 race was held at Franklin Park in Boston, on some of the same trails where she had won several Massachusetts state high school championships. She won consecutive 3000 m medals at the IAAF World Indoor Championships, taking bronze in 1993 then silver in 1995. Outdoors she had fifth-place finishes over 10,000 metres in both the 1991 and 1993 World Championships. She was also a nine-time U.S. Outdoor champion.

In 1999, approaching age 39, she ran officially in the Boston Marathon in 2:38.

Jennings currently lives in Portland, Oregon. She has become an accomplished masters rower (sculler), winning a gold medal in 2012 and bronze medal in 2011, in the women's grand master single scull event at the Head of the Charles Regatta, one of the most competitive and prestigious long-distance rowing races in the world.

In 2023, Jennings revealed that she had suffered sexual abuse at the hands of her longtime coach John Babington starting from when she was 15 years old. Babington, who was accused of abusing two other girls, confessed to the majority of accusations when questioned by The Boston Globe but cannot be charged due to the statute of limitations.

== Achievements ==
Year	Competition	Venue	Position	Event	Notes
Representing the United States
1986	World Cross Country Championships	Neuchâtel, Switzerland	2nd		
1987	World Cross Country Championships	Warsaw, Poland	4th		
1987	World Championships	Rome, Italy	6th	10,000 m	31:45.43
1988	World Cross Country Championships	Auckland, New Zealand	4th		
1988	Olympic Games	Seoul, South Korea	6th	10,000 m	31:39.93
1989	World Cross Country Championships	Stavanger, Norway	6th		
1990	World Cross Country Championships	Aix-les-Bains, France	1st		
1990	Goodwill Games	Seattle, United States	3rd	3000 m	8:52.34
1991	World Cross Country Championships	Antwerp, Belgium	1st		
1991	World Championships	Tokyo, Japan	5th	10,000 m	31:54.44
1992	World Cross Country Championships	Boston, United States	1st		
1992	Olympic Games	Barcelona, Spain	3rd	10,000 m	31:19.89
1993	World Indoor Championships	Toronto, Canada	3rd	3000 m	9:03.78
1993	World Cross Country Championships	Amorebieta-Etxano, Spain	3rd		
1993	World Championships	Stuttgart, Germany	5th	10,000 m	31:30.53
1995	World Indoor Championships	Barcelona, Spain	2nd	3000 m	8:55.23
1995	World Championships	Gothenburg, Sweden	12th	10,000 m	32:12.82
1996	Olympic Games	Atlanta, United States	9th	5000 m	15:17.50

Circuit wins

- Tufts Health Plan 10K for Women: 1977, 1989–1993
- Cinque Mulini (XC): 1986, 1987
- Pittsburgh Great Race: 1986
- Freihofer's Run for Women: 1987, 1988, 1990, 1993–1996, 1998
- Charlotte Observer 10K: 1987, 1988, 1992
- Peachtree Road Race: 1987
- Gate River Run: 1988, 1996, 1997, 1999
- Falmouth Road Race: 1992
- Bay to Breakers: 1993
- Tulsa Run: 1993
- Crim Festival of Races: 1993
- Manchester Road Race: 1994
- Feaster Five Road Race: 1996, 1997
- Mid Winter Classic: 1996, 1998

== See also ==
- List of Princeton University Olympians
