= Thierry Watrice =

French long-distance runner

Thierry Watrice (born 23 January 1957) is a French long-distance runner.

In the age-specific categories, he finished seventh in the 5000 metres at the 1975 European Junior Championships and fourth in the junior race at the 1976 World Cross Country Championships.

He competed in the senior race at the World Cross Country Championships in 1978, 1980, 1981 IAAF World Cross Country Championships – Senior men's race, 1982, 1983, 1984, 1986, 1987, 1989 and 1990. His results were varied, but his best individual placements were 15th in 1980 and 12th in 1986. In addition, his 35th place in 1978 helped secure France the team gold medal.

In the 10,000 metres, he finished ninth at the 1982 Athletics Championships and won the gold medal at the 1983 Mediterranean Games.

He became French national champion three times, one time each on the track, road and cross-country. He took the cross-country title in 1982, the 5000 metres title in 1983, and the marathon title in 1989. He represented the clubs Ozoir la Ferrière, CA Béglais, Asptt Bordeaux and SBUC during his career. He was coached by Michel Jazy among others.

His personal best times were 13:27.58 minutes in the 5000 metres, achieved in August 1983 at the Weltklasse in Zurich; 28:04.61 minutes in the 10,000 metres, achieved in June 1984 in Florence.
