= Haji Bulbula =

Ethiopian long-distance runner

Medal record

Men's athletics

Representing Ethiopia

African Championships
Silver medal – second place	1988 Annaba	5000 m
Silver medal – second place	1988 Annaba	10,000 m

Haji Bulbula (born 1961) is a retired Ethiopian long-distance runner.

== International competitions ==
Year	Competition	Venue	Position	Notes
1986	World Cross Country Championships	Neuchâtel, Switzerland	2nd	Team competition
1987	World Cross Country Championships	Warsaw, Poland	17th	Long race
1987	World Cross Country Championships	Warsaw, Poland	3rd	Team competition
1987	World Championships	Rome, Italy	23rd	10,000 m
1988	World Cross Country Championships	Auckland, New Zealand	10th	Long race
1988	World Cross Country Championships	Auckland, New Zealand	2nd	Team competition
1988	African Championships	Dakar, Senegal	2nd	5000 m
1988	African Championships	Dakar, Senegal	2nd	10,000 m
1989	World Cross Country Championships	Stavanger, Norway	3rd	Team competition
1990	World Cross Country Championships	Aix-les-Bains, France]	4th	Long race
1990	World Cross Country Championships	Aix-les-Bains, France]	2nd	Team competition
