= Roy Andersen =

Norwegian long-distance runner

Roy Andersen (born 2 April 1955) is a former Norwegian long-distance runner.

Internationally he finished tenth at the 1982 European Championships and 38th at the 1986 World Cross Country Championships. He also competed at the 1983 World Championships without reaching the final.

He became national marathon champion in 1987 and half marathon champion in 1988. He won the 5000 metres silver medals in 1982 and 1983, won the 10,000 metres silver in 1982, and a bronze in 1985. In cross-country running Andersen became national champion in 1982, 1985 and 1986 with a silver in 1988 (10 km). He represented the club Tønsberg FIK.

His personal best times were 8:01.58 minutes in the 3000 metres (1983), 8:47.61 minutes in the 3000 metres steeplechase (1981), 13:31.43 minutes in the 5000 metres (1983), 28:15.19 minutes in the 10,000 metres (1983), 1:02:42 hours in the half marathon (1986) and 2:12:47 hours in the marathon (1986).
