= Patricia Demilly =

French athletics competitor

Personal information
- Nationality: French
- Born: 27 December 1959 (age 65) Arnouville-lès-Gonesse
- Years active: 1980s

Sport
- Event(s): 1500 metres, cross-country running

Patricia Demilly (born Marchand; 27 December 1959 at Arnouville-lès-Gonesse) is a former French athlete, who specialized in the middle distance races.

== Biography ==
Patricia excelled in the IAAF World Cross Country Championships winning the team silver medal in 1987 and 1989 and the team bronze medal in 1988.

She won two French national athletic titles for the 1500 meters in 1987 and 1988.

=== Prize list ===
- French Championships in Athletics :
  - 2 times winner 1,500 m in 1987 and 1988.

=== Records ===
Personal Bests
| Event | Performance | Location | Date |
|---|---|---|---|
| 800 m | 2:09.4 | | 1981 |
| 1 500 m | 4:08.25 | | 1988 |

== Notes and references ==
- Docathlé2003, Fédération française d'athlétisme, 2003, p. 419
