= Vjatšeslav Košelev =

Estonian runner and miner

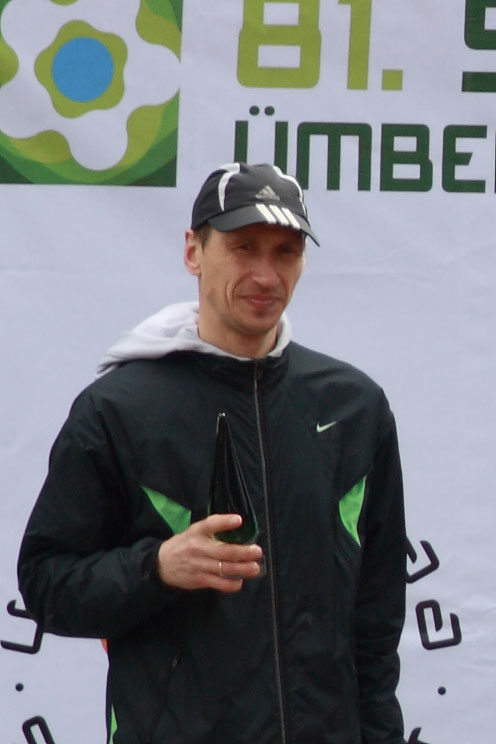
Vjatšeslav Košelev

Vjatšeslav Košelev (born 20 January 1968) is a Russian-born Estonian long distance runner, hurdler and miner.

He was born in Sverdlovsk, Russia. In 1987, he graduated from Sverdlovsk polytechnical school.

He started his athletics exercising in 1999, coached by Jevgeni Terentjev. In 1987 he won silver medal at European Junior Athletics Championships in the steeplechase running. He is 5-times Estonian champion in different running disciplines.

Since 1992 he is working as a miner in a quarry called "Estonia".
