= Joseph Farrugia (cyclist) =

Maltese cyclist (born 1955)

Personal information
- Born: 24 October 1955 (age 70)

Cycling career
- Sport: Cycling

Joseph Farrugia (born 24 October 1955) is a Maltese former cyclist. He competed in the individual road race and team time trial events at the 1980 Summer Olympics.
