= Diamantino dos Santos =

Brazilian long-distance runner

Personal information
- Full name: Diamantino Silveira dos Santos
- Born: 3 February 1961 (age 64) Carazinho, Rio Grande do Sul, Brazil
- Height: 1.66 m (5 ft 5 in)
- Weight: 59 kg (130 lb)

Sport
- Sport: Long-distance running
- Event: Marathon

Diamantino Silveira dos Santos (born 3 February 1961) is a Brazilian long-distance runner. He competed in the men's marathon at the 1988, 1992 and the 1996 Summer Olympics.
