= Bruce Bickford (athlete) =

American long-distance runner

Personal information
- Born: March 12, 1957 (age 69) East Benton, Maine, U.S.

Sport
- Sport: Track, long-distance running
- Events: 3000 meters, 2-mile, 5000 meters, 10,000 meters
- College team: Northeastern
- Coached by: Bob Sevene

Achievements and titles
- Personal bests: 3000m: 7:48.4; Indoor 2-mile: 8:28.2; 5000m: 13:13.49; 10,000m: 27:37.17 ½ marathon: 1:01:57; Marathon: 2:18:57
Medal record
Men's Athletics
Representing the United States
Pan American Games
Gold medal – first place	1987 Indianapolis	10,000 metres

Bruce Emery Bickford (born March 12, 1957) is a retired long-distance runner from the United States. He claimed the gold medal at the 1987 Pan American Games in the Men's 10,000 metres, and represented his native country in the 1988 Summer Olympics. He set his personal best (27:37.17) in the 10,000 metres in 1985 in Stockholm, Sweden. Bickford won a gold medal in the 1989 United States Olympic Festival Half Marathon.

== Running career ==
=== High school ===
Bickford graduated from Lawrence High School of Fairfield, Maine where he began his climb to stardom under the direction of his late coach, David F. Martin. Bickford played basketball in his freshman year of high school, and ran cross country for the first time as a sophomore. As a high-schooler, Bickford set the state record for Maine in the indoor 2-mile, with a time of 9:09.5, which he set in 1975 at the Dartmouth Relays.

=== Collegiate ===
He then went on to Northeastern University and was elected to the Northeastern University Athletics Hall of Fame in 1991. He was also inducted into the Maine Running Hall of Fame and the Maine Sports Hall of Fame. In 1977, Bickford set and still holds one of Northeastern University's longest standing track records in the 3,000 meter steeplechase, with a time of 8:33.6.

=== Post-collegiate ===
After his undergraduate studies, Bickford's first professional affiliation was with New Balance. Later into the 1980s he also raced in the Athletics West singlet, and was coached by Bob Sevene. Bickford finished second overall in the 1986 Philadelphia Distance Run behind New Balance teammate Mark Curp, finishing the half marathon in 1:01:57. He ran the men's 10,000 meters at the 1988 Summer Olympics in Seoul, South Korea, and finished in last place among the finishers in 29:09.74, after a bout of food poisoning.

=== Where He Is Now ===
Bickford now works at Lewiston Middle School in Lewiston, Maine, he works as a teaching assistant, substitute teacher and hall monitor. His favorite is working with Team Voyageurs.
