= Ed Eyestone =

American long distance runner and NCAA coach

Edward Eyestone
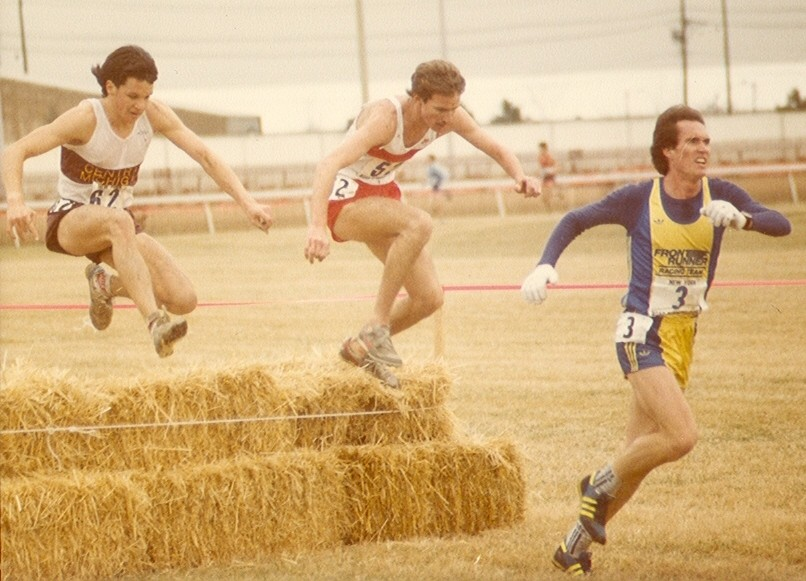
- Eyestone (middle) at the 1983 USA Cross Country Championships

Personal information
- Nationality: American
- Born: June 15, 1961 (age 65) American Samoa

Sport
- Sport: Track, long-distance running
- Events: 5000 meters, 10,000 meters, marathon
- College team: BYU
- Now coaching: BYU

Achievements and titles
- Olympic finals: 1988, 1992
- Personal bests: 5000 meters: 13:32.52; 10,000 meters: 27:41.05; Marathon: 2:10:59
Medal record
World Cross Country Championships
Bronze medal – third place	1980	Junior Men's Race (Individual)
Silver medal – second place	1983	Senior Men's Race (Team USA)
Silver medal – second place	1984	Senior Men's Race (Team USA)
Bronze medal – third place	1985	Senior Men's Race (Team USA)
Bronze medal – third place	1986	Senior Men's Race (Team USA)

Edward D. Eyestone (born June 15, 1961) is a two-time Olympic marathoner, long-distance runner, and an NCAA coach for the BYU Track Team. Eyestone was named National Coach of the Year in 2019 and 2024, after leading his NCAA D1 men's cross country teams to NCAA championships.

== Running career ==
=== High school ===
Eyestone graduated from Bonneville High School in Washington Terrace, Utah and was the Utah State High School State Champion in cross-country and track and field.

=== Collegiate ===
Eyestone attended Brigham Young University (BYU) earning a Bachelor of Arts (B.A.) in psychology and a Master of Science (M.S.) in exercise science. He served a two-year mission in Spain, but returned to BYU in 1982. At BYU, he became a 10-time NCAA All-American and in 1984 went undefeated in NCAA cross-country events. Eyestone is one of only four runners, along with Gerry Lindgren, Edward Cheserek, and Suleiman Nyambui, to capture the NCAA "Triple Crown" by becoming the 1985 NCAA Champion in cross-country, 5,000 meters and 10,000 meters. In 1985, the Academic All-American and recipient of the NCAA Top Six Award set a then-NCAA record in the 10,000 meters with a time of 27:41:05. As of 2018, it was still the third-fastest official 10,000 meter time in NCAA history. He finished his collegiate career with four NCAA Championships.

In 1986, Eyestone won the San Francisco Bay to Breakers 12 km race, defeating an estimated 110,000 competitors in what the Guinness Book of Records considers the world's largest footrace.

== International racing career ==
=== IAAF World Cross Country Championships ===
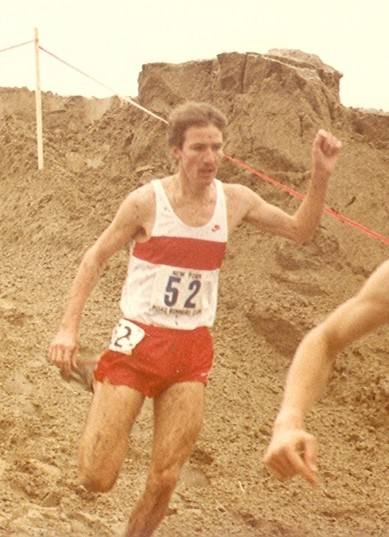
Ed Eyestone

1980 Junior Men's Individual Race - Bronze Medal
1983 Men's Team Event: USA - Silver Medal
1984 Men's Team Event: USA - Silver Medal
1985 Men's Team Event: USA - Bronze Medal
1986 Men's Team Event: USA - Bronze Medal

=== Olympic and International Distance Races ===
Olympic Marathon 1988 Seoul, South Korea (29th place, 2:19:09)
Olympic Marathon 1992 Barcelona, Spain (13th place, 2:15:23)
Personal Best Marathon: 2:10:59
Personal Best 10,000 Meters 27:40
Ranked in the “Top Ten” of US Marathoners, for nine years.
Ranked in the “Top Ten” of US 10,000 Meters for eight years.
Five Time US Road Racer of the Year.
1st place, Gate River Run 15K (Jacksonville, Florida), (1990)
1st place, Bellin 10K Run (Green Bay, Wisc.), (1991, 1992, 1993, 1994, 1995)
1st place, Bay to Breakers, (San Francisco, California) (1986)
1st place, Peachtree Road Race 10K (Atlanta, Georgia) (1991)
1st place, The Medical Center 10K Classic (Bowling Green, Kentucky) (1990)
1st place, Twin Cities Marathon in Minneapolis–Saint Paul, Minnesota (2:14:34) (1993)
21st place, World Championships in Athletics - Men's Marathon (1995)

== Post-racing career ==
After putting up his shoes, Eyestone has become a noted distance and road racing expert, serving as a columnist for Runner's World magazine and television commenter for ESPN's "Race of the Month" series. Eyestone served as an analyst for NBC Sports coverage of Track and Field and Race Walking at the 2008 Summer Olympics.

== Coaching career ==
Eyestone returned to BYU as both head coach of the cross-country team and men's track assistant coach in 2000 and was later promoted to head track coach in 2013. Coach Eyestone has been named "Coach of the Year" for NCAA D1 Men's Cross Country twice (2019, 2024), "Coach of the Year" for the West Coast Conference (WCC) seven times, and "Coach of the Year" for the Mountain West Conference (MWC) six times (2002, 2004–2008). He is a BYU Hall of Fame Inductee. Previously he served as assistant track coach at Weber State University (1996–98).

Coach Eyestone was named head coach of Team USA at the 2017 IAAF World Cross Country Championships in Kampala, Uganda.

On November 23, 2019, the BYU men's cross-country team (coached by Eyestone) won the NCAA D1 Championship race in Terre Haute, Indiana. Eyestone also became the first male to have both won an individual NCAA D1 Cross Country title and coach a Division 1 team to a national title. Eyestone was subsequently named the "Men's National Coach of the Year" (2019) by the U.S. Track & Field and Cross Country Coaches Association. Eyestone was also named the State of Utah's Governor's State of Sport Award for Collegiate "Coach of the Year" (2020).

As Conner Mantz transitioned from BYU to marathon racing at Chicago and Boston, Eyestone stayed in the coach role and his name continued to be mentioned throughout running media.

== Personal life ==
Eyestone is a member of the Church of Jesus Christ of Latter-day Saints, and he was one of three return missionaries to participate in the 1988 Summer Olympics along with Henry Marsh and Doug Padilla.
