= Habte Negash =

Ethiopian long-distance runner

Habte Negash (born 1967) is a retired Ethiopian long-distance runner. He had success at the IAAF World Cross Country Championships, taking the junior silver in 1985 and going on to share in the senior team silver medal with Ethiopia at both the 1988 and 1991 editions.

== Achievements ==
Year	Competition	Venue	Position	Notes
1985	World Cross Country Championships	Lisbon, Portugal	2nd	Junior race
1985	World Cross Country Championships	Lisbon, Portugal	1st	Team competition
1986	World Cross Country Championships	Neuchâtel, Switzerland	6th	Junior race
1988	World Cross Country Championships	Auckland, New Zealand	12th	Long race
1988	World Cross Country Championships	Auckland, New Zealand	2nd	Team competition
1991	World Cross Country Championships	Antwerp, Belgium	2nd	Team competition
