= Wodajo Bulti =

Ethiopian long-distance runner

Medal record

Men's athletics

Representing Ethiopia

African Championships
Gold medal – first place	1982 Cairo	5000 m
Gold medal – first place	1985 Cairo	5000 m
Gold medal – first place	1985 Cairo	10,000 m
Bronze medal – third place	1982 Cairo	1500 m

Wodajo Bulti (born 11 March 1957) is a retired Ethiopian long-distance runner who specialized in the 5000 metres, 10000 metres and cross-country running.

== Career ==
Wodajo was one of the most significant Ethiopian middle and long-distance runners in the 1980s. In his early years on the track he concentrated more on shorter distances such as 1500 metres because of great depth of Ethiopian talent over longer distances. He spent these years in the shadow of great Miruts Yifter, double Olympic Champion from Moscow and Mohamed Kedir, Olympic and World Cup medalist.

His breakthrough came in 1982, at 25 years of age, when Wodajo finished at third place over 1500 m at the 1982 African Championships in Athletics in Cairo and followed it by the gold medal at 5000 metres. On 16 September in Rieti, he won at 5000 m in huge personal best time of 13:07.29 minutes, recording third fastest time ever. With such achievements behind him, he was somewhat disappointed when finished at seventh place over 5000 m at next year's inaugural 1983 World Championships in Athletics in Helsinki.

In 1984, he was strong 5000 m medal contender for the Olympic Games in Los Angeles, finishing second in Florence behind Said Aouita in a time of 13:10.08 minutes (fourth in the yearly rankings), but was unable to compete in the Olympics due to the Ethiopian boycott. At the Friendship Games in Moscow, Bulti came third at 5000 m and second at 10,000 metres, breaking the 28 minute barrier. After these performances, Wodajo exploded in 1985 and opened season with the bronze medal at the 1985 IAAF World Cross Country Championships, finishing behind Carlos Lopes and Paul Kipkoech. At the African Championships, he became champion at both, 5000 m and 10,000 m distances, beating many great runners and relegating Kipkoech to second respectively third place. He was elected to represent Africa over both distances at the World Cup in Canberra and at day one, he won the gold over longer distance thanks to his fast finish and followed it by the bronze medal performance over 5000 m.

Bulti concentrated on longer distances for the remainder of his career and in 1987, he won in Helsinki over 10,000 m in new personal best time of 27:29.41 minutes which placed him second at 1987 world lists, but finished a disastrous 24th at the World Championships in Rome. He set career best of 2:08:44 finishing third in Rotterdam Marathon in 1988, but again, he was unable to compete at the Olympic Games in Seoul, due to the continued Ethiopian boycott.

== Achievements ==
Year	Competition	Venue	Position	Event	Notes
Representing Ethiopia
1982	World Cross Country Championships	Rome, Italy	12th	Long race	
1982	World Cross Country Championships	Rome, Italy	1st	Team	
1982	African Championships	Cairo, Egypt	3rd	1500 m	
1982	African Championships	Cairo, Egypt	1st	5000 m	
1983	World Cross Country Championships	Gateshead, United Kingdom	20th	Long race	
1983	World Cross Country Championships	Gateshead, United Kingdom	1st	Team	
1983	World Championships	Helsinki, Finland	7th	5000 m	
1984	World Cross Country Championships	New York City, United States	1st	Team	
1984	Friendship Games	Moscow, Soviet Union	3rd	5000 m	13:29.08
1984	Friendship Games	Moscow, Soviet Union	2nd	10,000 m	27:58.97
1985	World Cross Country Championships	Lisbon, Portugal	3rd	Long race	
1985	World Cross Country Championships	Lisbon, Portugal	1st	Team	
1985	African Championships	Cairo, Egypt	1st	5000 m	
1985	African Championships	Cairo, Egypt	1st	10,000 m	
1985	World Cup	Canberra, Australia	3rd	5000 m	
1985	World Cup	Canberra, Australia	1st	10,000 m	
1986	World Cross Country Championships	Neuchâtel, Switzerland	2nd	Team	
1987	World Cross Country Championships	Warsaw, Poland	3rd	Team	
1987	World Championships	Rome, Italy	24th	10,000 m	
