= Ahmed Adam Salah =

Sudanese long-distance runner

Personal information
- Nationality: Sudanese
- Born: 10 January 1966 (age 60)

Sport
- Sport: Long-distance running
- Event: Marathon

Ahmed Adam Salah (born 10 January 1966) is a Sudanese long-distance runner. He competed in the men's marathon at the 1996 Summer Olympics.
