= Some Muge =

Kenyan long-distance runner

Some Muge (1959–1997) was a Kenyan long-distance runner.

He is best known for winning Kenya's first medal at the IAAF World Cross Country Championships, preceding many others. This happened when he won the bronze medal in the long race of the 1983 World Cross Country Championships. Kenya also took bronze medals in the team competition. He had previously won the team bronze at the 1981 World Cross Country Championships, after finishing 57th in the race. At the 1986 World Cross Country Championships he finished eighth in the race and won a gold medal in the team competition, and at the 1987 World Cross Country Championships he finished fifth in the race and won another team gold medal. He also won the bronze medal in the 10,000 metres at the All-Africa Games, and finished 22nd in the 10,000 metres at the 1987 World Championships.

He was the father of runners Mathew Kipkoech Kisorio (born 1989), Peter Kimeli Some (born 1990) and Nicholas Kipchirchir Togom.
