= Boniface Merande =

Kenyan long-distance runner

Medal record

Men's athletics

Representing Kenya

African Championships
Bronze medal – third place	1989 Lagos	3000 m st.

Boniface Merande (born 13 February 1962) is a retired Kenyan long-distance runner, who represented his native country at the 1988 Summer Olympics in Seoul, South Korea. Four years later he finished in 14th position in the 1992 Olympic Marathon.

He finished seventh at the 1993 World Championships in 2:18:52 hours. He also won a bronze medal in 3000 metres steeplechase at the 1989 African Championships and finished 14th at the 1992 Summer Olympics.

== Achievements ==
- All results regarding marathon, unless stated otherwise

Year	Competition	Venue	Position	Notes
Representing Kenya
1992	Olympic Games	Barcelona, Spain	14th	2:15:46
1993	World Championships	Stuttgart, Germany	7th	2:18:52
