= Mohamed Kedir =

Ethiopian long-distance runner

Personal information
- Born: September 22, 1956 (age 69)
Medal record
Men's Athletics
Representing Ethiopia
Olympic Games
Bronze medal – third place	1980 Moscow	10,000 m
World Cross Country Championships
Gold medal – first place	1982 Rome	Senior race
All-Africa Games
Bronze medal – third place	1978 Algiers	10,000 metres
African Championships
Gold medal – first place	1982 Cairo	10,000 m

Mohamed Kedir (Amharic: ሞሐመድ ከድር; born September 18, 1954) is a former long-distance runner from Ethiopia, who won a bronze medal in men's 10,000 metres at the 1980 Summer Olympics.

In the 5,000 metres final at the same Olympics, Kedir was leading with 300 metres to go when Ireland's Eamonn Coghlan overtook him. Shortly after that, Kedir moved out to the second lane to let his teammate Miruts Yifter pass him, Yifter did and sprinted past Coghlan. Moments after moving to the second lane, Kedir fell - apparently after colliding with another Ethiopian runner, Yohannes Mohamed. Having lost his rhythm, Kedir finished in the 12th and last place. (See YouTube, 1980 Olympics 5000 metres).
Kedir won men's long-distance cross country World Championship in 1982 (see below). His last major international race occurred in Helsinki, Finland, at the 1983 inaugural World Athletics Championships. There he finished ninth at 10,000 metres. (See, for example, the Finnish Broadcasting Corporation YLE's Living Archives / Elävä arkisto, links: Urheilu / Sports, Yleisurheilu / Athletics, MM-kisat / World Championships, MM-kisat 1983 / World Championships 1983, Suomalaiset lähellä huippua / Finns Near the Top).

== International competitions ==
Year	Competition	Venue	Position	Event	Notes
Representing Ethiopia
1982	African Championships	Cairo, Egypt	1st	10,000 m	28:55.50
