= Abebe Mekonnen =

Ethiopian long-distance runner

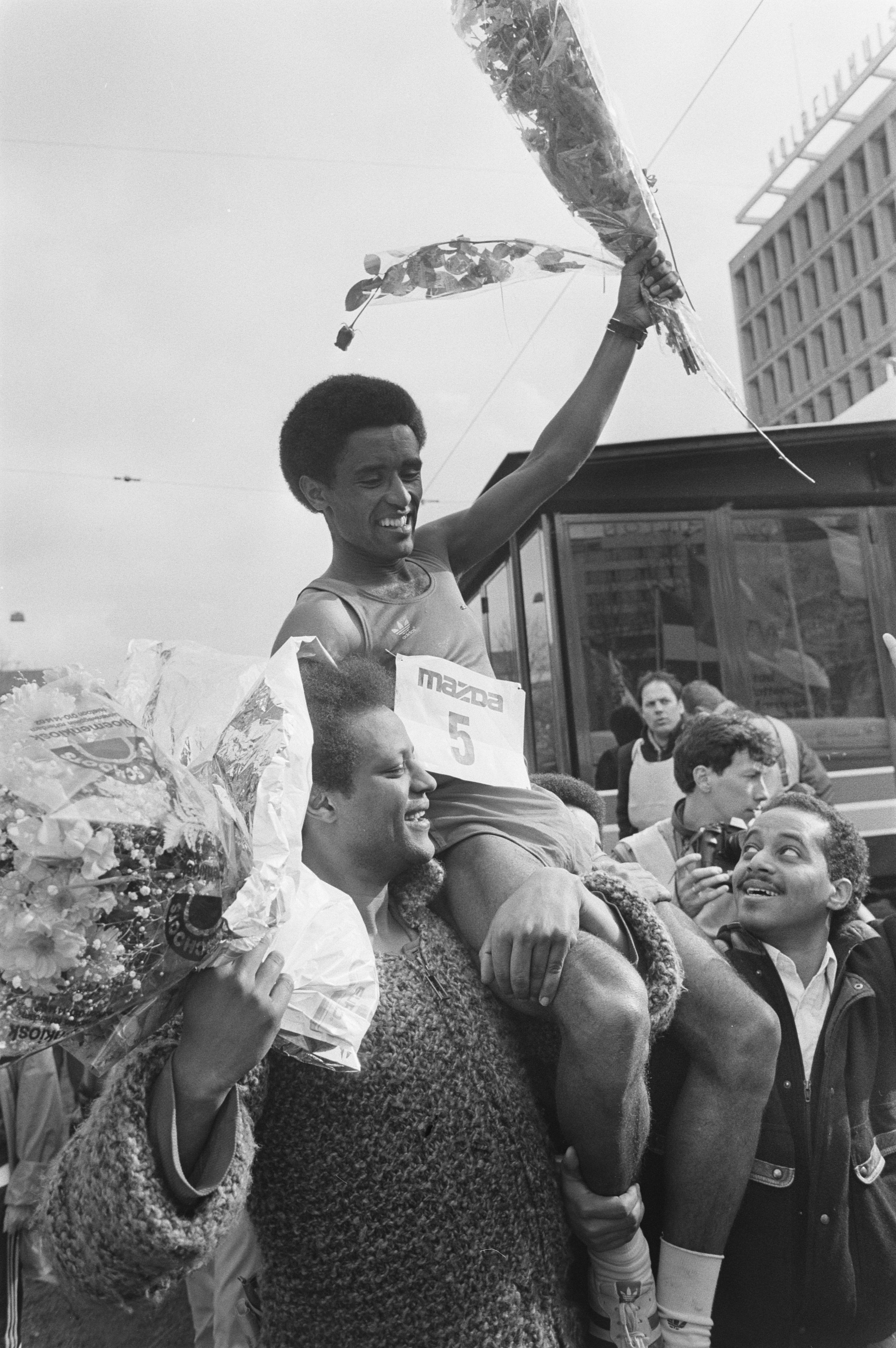
Abebe Mekonnen

Abebe Mekonnen (born 16 October 1964) is an Ethiopian long-distance runner.

Mekkonen was the winner of the 93rd Boston Marathon in 1989. He also competed for Ethiopia in the 1992 Olympics and 1996 Olympics in the marathon. He did not finish in the 1992 games and finished 81st with a time of 2:29:45 in the 1996 Summer Olympics.

Mekonnen has the most sub 2:15 marathons of anyone: 32 in all. When he ran his 28th sub-2:15 marathon he broke the record set by Bill Rodgers.

His best time was 2:07:35 in the 1988 Beijing Marathon, which is still course record.

== Achievements ==
Year	Competition	Venue	Position	Event	Notes
Representing Ethiopia
1984	Friendship Games	Moscow, Soviet Union	2nd	Marathon	2:11:30
1985	Tokyo International Marathon	Tokyo, Japan	4th	Marathon	2:12:39
1985	1985 World Marathon Cup	Hiroshima, Japan	5th	Marathon	2:09:05
1985	Fukuoka Marathon	Fukuoka, Japan	7th	Marathon	2:13:23
1986	Tokyo International Marathon	Tokyo, Japan	3rd	Marathon	2:08:39
1986	Rotterdam Marathon	Rotterdam, Netherlands	1st	Marathon	2:09:08
1986	Marathon Oasis de Montreal	Montréal, Canada	1st	Marathon	2:10:31
1987	Tokyo International Marathon	Tokyo, Japan	3rd	Marathon	2:11:54
1987	Paris Marathon	Paris, France	1st	Marathon	2:11:09
1987	All-Africa Games	Nairobi, Kenya	2nd	10,000 m	28:58.70
1987	World Championships	Rome, Italy	—	Marathon	DNF
1988	Tokyo Marathon	Tokyo, Japan	1st	Marathon	2:08:33
1988	Rotterdam Marathon	Rotterdam, Netherlands	4th	Marathon	2:09:33
1988	Beijing Marathon	Beijing, PR China	1st	Marathon	2:07:35
1989	Boston Marathon	Boston, United States	1st	Marathon	2:09:06
1989	Fukuoka Marathon	Fukuoka, Japan	7th	Marathon	2:14:29
1990	Rotterdam Marathon	Rotterdam, Netherlands	2nd	Marathon	2:11:52
1991	Tokyo Marathon	Tokyo, Japan	1st	Marathon	2:10:26
1991	Boston Marathon	Boston, United States	2nd	Marathon	2:11:22
1991	World Championships	Tokyo, Japan	—	Marathon	DNF
1991	Fukuoka Marathon	Fukuoka, Japan	4th	Marathon	2:11:39
1992	Boston Marathon	Boston, United States	8th	Marathon	2:13:09
1992	Olympic Games	Barcelona, Spain	—	Marathon	DNF
1993	Tokyo Marathon	Tokyo, Japan	1st	Marathon	2:12:00
1993	World Championships	Stuttgart, Germany	—	Marathon	DNF
1994	Tokyo International Marathon	Tokyo, Japan	5th	Marathon	2:12:13
1994	London Marathon	London, United Kingdom	2nd	Marathon	2:09:17
1994	Beijing Marathon	Beijing, China	2nd	Marathon	2:11:33
1995	World Championships	Gothenburg, Sweden	47th	Marathon	2:32:35
1996	Lake Biwa Marathon	Ōtsu, Japan	3rd	Marathon	2:11:55
1996	Boston Marathon	Boston, United States	6th	Marathon	2:10:21
1996	Olympic Games	Atlanta, United States	81st	Marathon	2:29:45
1996	Beijing Marathon	Beijing, China	7th	Marathon	2:13:21
1997	Seoul International Marathon	Seoul, South Korea	3rd	Marathon	2:12:45
1997	Rotterdam Marathon	Rotterdam, Netherlands	5th	Marathon	2:08:46
1997	Chuncheon Marathon	Chuncheon, South Korea	4th	Marathon	2:10:27
1998	Tiberias Marathon	Sea of Gallilee, Israel	2nd	Marathon	2:14:09
1998	London Marathon	London, United Kingdom	5th	Marathon	2:09:52
1998	Berlin Marathon	Berlin, Germany	8th	Marathon	2:12:13

== See also ==
- List of winners of the Boston Marathon
