= John Ngugi =

Kenyan long-distance runner

Personal information
- Born: 1962-05-10
Medal record
Men's athletics
Representing Kenya
Olympic Games
Gold medal – first place	1988 Seoul	5000 m
All-Africa Games
Gold medal – first place	1987 Nairobi	5000 m
African Championships
Gold medal – first place	1989 Lagos	5000 m
Bronze medal – third place	1985 Cairo	5000 m
Commonwealth Games
Silver medal – second place	1990 Auckland	5000 m

John Ngūgi Kamau (born 10 May 1962) is a former Kenyan long-distance runner, often called one of the greatest cross country runners of all time and winner of the 5000 metres at the 1988 Summer Olympics, in Seoul, South Korea.

== Career ==
Born in Kigumo, Muranga District, John Ngūgi's John Ngugi's earliest international successes came at the World Cross Country Championships, where he won a record four consecutive titles between 1986 and 1989 and five titles overall.

Ngūgi established himself as a track runner when he won his heat of the 5000 m at the 1987 World Championships in Rome. In the final, Ngūgi took the lead during the second kilometer, but despite his front-running tactics, he was outsprinted in the finish, finishing in a disappointing twelfth place. He won 5000 metres race in the 1987 All-Africa Games held in Kenya.

At the Seoul Olympic Games, Ngūgi took the lead after the kilometer and achieved a 50 m lead. Although his lead was reduced when the expected sprints came in the last lap, Ngūgi still won by 30 meters.

At the 1990 Commonwealth Games in Auckland, New Zealand, Ngūgi tried exactly the same tactics which had won him the Olympic gold medal. Although he tripped and fell after only two laps and lost 35 m on the rest of the field, he caught the leading group and establish a gap of 40 m at the bell. But in this time, that wasn't enough, as Andrew Lloyd from Australia won by a mere 0.08 seconds in an incredible finishing burst.

Ngūgi returned in 1992 to capture the World Cross Country title for the fifth time. That was his final appearance at a major international championship before his retirement.

In 1993 Ngūgi refused to take an out-of-competition drug test, and he then received a four-year suspension for the infraction. He contested the ruling, spending $80,000 of his own money to fight his case in Monaco. His ban was later reduced as it was judged that the Kenya Athletics Federation had not followed its duty of educating its athletes about out-of-competition testing and that Ngūgi had a limited education. However, the long battle to contest the decision brought an end to his running career as his physical fitness had heavily declined over the period.
