= 1989 IAAF World Cross Country Championships – Senior men's race =

Race held in Stavanger, Norway

Senior men's race at the 1989 IAAF World Cross Country Championships
- Organisers: IAAF
- Edition: 17th
- Date: March 19
- Host city: Stavanger, Rogaland, Norway
- Venue: Scanvest Ring
- Events: 1
- Distances: 12 km – Senior men
- Participation: 200 athletes from 35 nations

The Senior men's race at the 1989 IAAF World Cross Country Championships was held in Stavanger, Norway, at the Scanvest Ring on March 19, 1989. A report on the event was given in the Glasgow Herald.

Complete results, medallists, and the results of British athletes were published.

== Race results ==
=== Senior men's race (12 km) ===
==== Individual ====
Rank	Athlete	Country	Time
1st place, gold medalist(s)	John Ngugi	Kenya	39:42
2nd place, silver medalist(s)	Tim Hutchings	United Kingdom	40:10
3rd place, bronze medalist(s)	Wilfred Kirochi	Kenya	40:21
4	Steve Moneghetti	Australia	40:24
5	Tesfaye Tafa	Ethiopia	40:26
6	Alejandro Gómez	Spain	40:29
7	Andrew Masai	Kenya	40:32
8	Kipkemboi Kimeli	Kenya	40:34
9	Moses Tanui	Kenya	40:42
10	John Halvorsen	Norway	40:45
11	Bruno Le Stum	France	40:48
12	Francesco Panetta	Italy	40:51
13	Bekele Debele	Ethiopia	40:53
14	Gary Staines	United Kingdom	40:55
15	Dave Clarke	United Kingdom	40:56
16	Joseph Kiptum	Kenya	40:57
17	Salvatore Bettiol	Italy	41:00
18	Constantino Esparcia	Spain	41:02
19	Thierry Pantel	France	41:03
20	Francisco Alario	Spain	41:07
21	Pierre Levisse	France	41:09
22	Craig Mochrie	United Kingdom	41:13
23	Haydar Dogan	Turkey	41:21
24	Vicente Polo	Spain	41:22
25	Boniface Merande	Kenya	41:23
26	Dionísio Castro	Portugal	41:24
27	Wolde Silasse Melkessa	Ethiopia	41:25
28	Carlo Terzer	Italy	41:26
29	Artur Castro	Brazil	41:30
30	Ed Eyestone	United States	41:31
31	Pat Porter	United States	41:31
32	Leszek Bebło	Poland	41:42
33	Melese Feissa	Ethiopia	41:43
34	Raf Wijns	Belgium	41:44
35	Gerry Curtis	Ireland	41:44
36	Jackson Ruto	Kenya	41:45
37	Debebe Demisse	Ethiopia	41:46
38	Dominique Chauvelier	France	41:47
39	Mark Coogan	United States	41:49
40	Mathias Ntawulikura	Rwanda	41:49
41	Joaquim Silva	Portugal	41:50
42	Darren Wilson	Australia	41:51
43	Fernando Mamede	Portugal	41:51
44	Ibrahim Kinuthia	Kenya	41:53
45	Dave Lewis	United Kingdom	41:54
46	Cyrille Laventure	France	41:58
47	Haji Bulbula	Ethiopia	41:59
48	Manuel Matias	Portugal	42:00
49	Richard Nerurkar	United Kingdom	42:00
50	Risto Ulmala	Finland	42:01
51	Aart Stigter	Netherlands	42:02
52	Bruno Levant	France	42:03
53	Rex Wilson	New Zealand	42:05
54	François Barreau	France	42:06
55	Hammou Boutayeb	Morocco	42:07
56	Khalid Skah	Morocco	42:09
57	Andrew Lloyd	Australia	42:11
58	José Carlos Adán	Spain	42:12
59	Malcolm Norwood	Australia	42:15
60	Nick de Castella	Australia	42:16
61	Doug Cronkite	Canada	42:17
62	Adam Hoyle	Australia	42:17
63	Martín Fiz	Spain	42:18
64	Shozo Shimoju	Japan	42:19
65	Derrick Lakeman	United States	42:22
66	Lars-Erik Nilsson	Sweden	42:23
67	Marcel Versteeg	Netherlands	42:24
68	Raffaello Alliegro	Italy	42:24
69	Karol Dolega	Poland	42:25
70	Håkan Börjesson	Sweden	42:26
71	Vanderlei de Lima	Brazil	42:28
72	Joaquim Pinheiro	Portugal	42:29
73	Antonio Serrano	Spain	42:30
74	Ravil Kashapov	Soviet Union	42:30
75	Domingos Castro	Portugal	42:31
76	Jean Lagarde	Canada	42:32
77	Bedile Kibret	Ethiopia	42:36
78	Severino Bernardini	Italy	42:38
79	John Woods	Ireland	42:40
80	Paul Williams	Canada	42:43
81	Tom Ansberry	United States	42:44
82	Aaron Ramirez	United States	42:45
83	Simon Gutierrez	United States	42:46
84	Fernando Couto	Portugal	42:46
85	Antonio Prieto	Spain	42:47
86	Jonny Danielson	Sweden	42:48
87	Jos Maes	Belgium	42:48
88	Miroslaw Golebiewski	Poland	42:49
89	Roger Gjøvaag	Norway	42:50
90	Luc Peerlinck	Belgium	42:51
91	Yevgeniy Okorokov	Soviet Union	42:51
92	Tommy Ekblom	Finland	42:52
93	Eamonn Martin	United Kingdom	42:52
94	Mohamed El Massoudi	Morocco	42:53
95	Johni Pazin	Brazil	42:55
96	Peter Brett	Australia	42:55
97	Demeke Bekele	Ethiopia	42:56
98	Sanshiro Kasama	Japan	42:57
99	Marti ten Kate	Netherlands	42:58
100	Markus Graf	Switzerland	42:59
101	Mikhail Dasko	Soviet Union	42:59
102	Willy van Huylenbroeck	Belgium	43:00
103	Harri Hänninen	Finland	43:00
104	Espen Borge	Norway	43:01
105	Mads Jacobsen	Denmark	43:04
106	Andy Ronan	Ireland	43:05
107	Kozu Akutsu	Japan	43:11
108	Vesa Siivonen	Finland	43:12
109	Herman Decoux	Belgium	43:13
110	Kazunichi Yamada	Japan	43:13
111	Thierry Watrice	France	43:14
112	Diamantino dos Santos	Brazil	43:14
113	Håkan Eriksson	Sweden	43:16
114	Jean-Louis Prianon	France	43:19
115	Stefano Mei	Italy	43:21
116	John Vermeule	Netherlands	43:22
117	Bo Reed	United States	43:23
118	Henryk Jankowski	Poland	43:23
119	Thomas Sørensen	Denmark	43:24
120	Henk Gommer	Netherlands	43:26
121	Yevgeniy Leontyev	Soviet Union	43:27
122	Graeme Fell	Canada	43:27
123	Sergey Maksimov	Soviet Union	43:28
124	Roy Dooney	Ireland	43:29
125	Habte Negash	Ethiopia	43:31
126	Angelo Carosi	Italy	43:32
127	Tom Maher	Ireland	43:33
128	João de Sousa	Brazil	43:33
129	Toshiyuki Hayata	Japan	43:34
130	Antonio da Silva	Brazil	43:34
131	Are Nakkim	Norway	43:35
132	Oleg Syroyezhko	Soviet Union	43:36
133	Takehiko Miura	Japan	43:38
134	Terje Näss	Norway	43:40
135	Art Boileau	Canada	43:42
136	Geoff Turnbull	United Kingdom	43:43
137	José Manuel Albentosa	Spain	43:45
138	Patric Nilsson	Sweden	43:47
139	Slawomir Majusiak	Poland	43:50
140	Akira Nakamura	Japan	43:51
141	Dag Øxnevad	Norway	43:52
142	Håvard Tveite	Norway	43:54
143	Antonio Humberto	Colombia	43:55
144	Mark Stickley	United States	43:56
145	Mark Furlan	New Zealand	43:56
146	Jörgen Salo	Finland	44:03
147	Stig Nørregaard	Denmark	44:13
148	Allen Hugli	Canada	44:15
149	Jan Huruk	Poland	44:22
150	David Carrie	Ireland	44:23
151	Kenji Ayabe	Japan	44:24
152	Steen Christensen	Denmark	44:26
153	Eirik Hansen	Norway	44:30
154	Jari Venäläinen	Finland	44:33
155	Sabag Shemtov	Israel	44:36
156	Ahmed Chantibou	Morocco	44:39
157	Patrik Merup	Sweden	44:45
158	John Fitzgerald	Ireland	44:47
159	German Peña	Colombia	44:57
160	Jukka Tammisuo	Finland	45:01
161	Jamie Harrison	Australia	45:03
162	Arcario Tamayo	Venezuela	45:05
163	David Rush	New Zealand	45:12
164	Niels Kim Hjorth	Denmark	45:17
165	Jyrki Ojennus	Finland	45:17
166	Örjan Hemström	Sweden	45:18
167	Roger Jaspers	Netherlands	45:22
168	Peter Würtz	Denmark	45:31
169	Søren Munch	Denmark	45:34
170	Nicos Vasiliou	Cyprus	45:38
171	Junichi Takita	Japan	45:39
172	Oscar González	Venezuela	45:41
173	Visa Orttenvuori	Finland	45:42
174	Mohamed Moujani	Morocco	45:42
175	John Sheehan	Australia	45:57
176	Peter Troldborg	Denmark	46:02
177	Zeki Öztürk	Turkey	46:08
178	Clive Hamilton	Jamaica	46:08
179	Valdenor dos Santos	Brazil	46:25
180	Johann Ingibergsson	Iceland	46:31
181	Frimann Hreinsson	Iceland	46:35
182	Ho Hsin-Ye	Chinese Taipei	46:39
183	Driss Hamdi	Morocco	46:48
184	Chou Hsien-Kuang	Chinese Taipei	46:50
185	Derick Adamson	Jamaica	46:55
186	James Stafford	Canada	47:00
187	Gunnlaugur Skulason	Iceland	47:03
188	Mohamed Nasser Al-Zaidi	North Yemen	47:19
189	Linton McKenzie	Jamaica	47:21
190	Agust Thorsteinsson	Iceland	47:46
191	Sigurdur Sigmundsson	Iceland	48:32
192	Daniel Gudmundsson	Iceland	48:58
193	Mohamed Ahmed Shared	North Yemen	49:47
194	Kristjan Skuli Asgeirsson	Iceland	51:09
195	Naraindra Chutto	Mauritius	51:21
—	Ezequiel Canario	Portugal	DNF
—	Roger Hackney	United Kingdom	DNF
—	Carlos Monteiro	Portugal	DNF
—	Pär Wallin	Sweden	DNF
—	Walter Merlo	Italy	DNF

==== Teams ====
Rank	Team	Points
1st place, gold medalist(s)	Kenya: John Ngugi / 1; Wilfred Kirochi / 3; Andrew Masai / 7; Kipkemboi Kimeli / 8; Moses Tanui / 9; Joseph Kiptum / 16; (Boniface Merande) / (25); (Jackson Ruto) / (36); (Ibrahim Kinuthia) / (44)	44
2nd place, silver medalist(s)	United Kingdom: Tim Hutchings / 2; Gary Staines / 14; Dave Clarke / 15; Craig Mochrie / 22; Dave Lewis / 45; Richard Nerurkar / 49; (Eamonn Martin) / (93); (Geoff Turnbull) / (136); (Roger Hackney) / (DNF)	147
3rd place, bronze medalist(s)	Ethiopia: Tesfaye Tafa / 5; Bekele Debele / 13; Wolde Silasse Melkessa / 27; Melese Feissa / 33; Debebe Demisse / 37; Haji Bulbula / 47; (Bedile Kibret) / (77); (Demeke Bekele) / (97); (Habte Negash) / (125)	162
4	France: Bruno Le Stum / 11; Thierry Pantel / 19; Pierre Levisse / 21; Dominique Chauvelier / 38; Cyrille Laventure / 46; Bruno Levant / 52; (François Barreau) / (54); (Thierry Watrice) / (111); (Jean-Louis Prianon) / (114)	187
5	Spain: Alejandro Gómez / 6; Constantino Esparcia / 18; Francisco Alario / 20; Vicente Polo / 24; José Carlos Adán / 58; Martín Fiz / 63; (Antonio Serrano) / (73); (Antonio Prieto) / (85); (José Manuel Albentosa) / (137)	189
6	Australia: Steve Moneghetti / 4; Darren Wilson / 42; Andrew Lloyd / 57; Malcolm Norwood / 59; Nick de Castella / 60; Adam Hoyle / 62; (Peter Brett) / (96); (Jamie Harrison) / (161); (John Sheehan) / (175)	284
7	Portugal: Dionísio Castro / 26; Joaquim Silva / 41; Fernando Mamede / 43; Manuel Matias / 48; Joaquim Pinheiro / 72; Domingos Castro / 75; (Fernando Couto) / (84); (Ezequiel Canario) / (DNF); (Carlos Monteiro) / (DNF)	305
8	Italy: Francesco Panetta / 12; Salvatore Bettiol / 17; Carlo Terzer / 28; Raffaello Alliegro / 68; Severino Bernardini / 78; Stefano Mei / 115; (Angelo Carosi) / (126); (Walter Merlo) / (DNF)	318
9	United States: Ed Eyestone / 30; Pat Porter / 31; Mark Coogan / 39; Derrick Lakeman / 65; Tom Ansberry / 81; Aaron Ramirez / 82; (Simon Gutierrez) / (83); (Bo Reed) / (117); (Mark Stickley) / (144)	328
10	Brazil: Artur Castro / 29; Vanderlei de Lima / 71; Johni Pazin / 95; Diamantino dos Santos / 112; João de Sousa / 128; Antonio da Silva / 130; (Valdenor dos Santos) / (179)	565
11	Poland: Leszek Bebło / 32; Karol Dolega / 69; Miroslaw Golebiewski / 88; Henryk Jankowski / 118; Slawomir Majusiak / 139; Jan Huruk / 149	595
12	Norway: John Halvorsen / 10; Roger Gjøvaag / 89; Espen Borge / 104; Are Nakkim / 131; Terje Näss / 134; Dag Øxnevad / 141; (Håvard Tveite) / (142); (Eirik Hansen) / (153)	609
13	Netherlands: Aart Stigter / 51; Marcel Versteeg / 67; Martin ten Kate / 99; John Vermeule / 116; Henk Gommer / 120; Roger Jaspers / 167	620
14	Ireland: Gerry Curtis / 35; John Woods / 79; Andy Ronan / 106; Roy Dooney / 124; Tom Maher / 127; David Carrie / 150; (John Fitzgerald) / (158)	621
15	Canada: Doug Cronkite / 61; Jean Lagarde / 76; Paul Williams / 80; Graeme Fell / 122; Art Boileau / 135; Allen Hugli / 148; (James Stafford) / (186)	622
16	Sweden: Lars-Erik Nilsson / 66; Håkan Börjesson / 70; Jonny Danielson / 86; Håkan Eriksson / 113; Patric Nilsson / 138; Patrik Merup / 157; (Örjan Hemström) / (166); (Pär Wallin) / (DNF)	630
17	Japan: Shozo Shimoju / 64; Sanshiro Kasama / 98; Kozu Akutsu / 107; Kazunichi Yamada / 110; Toshiyuki Hayata / 129; Takehiko Miura / 133; (Akira Nakamura) / (140); (Kenji Ayabe) / (151); (Junichi Takita) / (171)	641
18	Soviet Union: Ravil Kashapov / 74; Yevgeniy Okorokov / 91; Mikhail Dasko / 101; Yevgeniy Leontyev / 121; Sergey Maksimov / 123; Oleg Syroyezhko / 132	642
19	Finland: Risto Ulmala / 50; Tommy Ekblom / 92; Harri Hänninen / 103; Vesa Siivonen / 108; Jörgen Salo / 146; Jari Venäläinen / 154; (Jukka Tammisuo) / (160); (Jyrki Ojennus) / (165); (Visa Orttenvuori) / (173)	653
20	Morocco: Hammou Boutayeb / 55; Khalid Skah / 56; Mohamed El Massoudi / 94; Ahmed Chantibou / 156; Mohamed Moujani / 174; Driss Hamdi / 183	718
21	Denmark: Mads Jacobsen / 105; Thomas Sørensen / 119; Stig Nørregaard / 147; Steen Christensen / 152; Niels Kim Hjorth / 164; Peter Würtz / 168; (Søren Munch) / (169); (Peter Troldborg) / (176)	855
22	Iceland: Johann Ingibergsson / 180; Frimann Hreinsson / 181; Gunnlaugur Skulason / 187; Agust Thorsteinsson / 190; Sigurdur Sigmundsson / 191; Daniel Gudmundsson / 192; (Kristjan Skuli Asgeirsson) / (194)	1121

- Note: Athletes in parentheses did not score for the team result

== Participation ==
An unofficial count yields the participation of 200 athletes from 35 countries in the Senior men's race. This is in agreement with the official numbers as published.

- Australia (9)
- Belgium (5)
- Brazil (7)
- Canada (7)
- Chinese Taipei (2)
- Colombia (2)
- Cyprus (1)
- Denmark (8)
- Ethiopia (9)
- Finland (9)
- France (9)
- Iceland (7)
- Ireland (7)
- Israel (1)
- Italy (8)
- Jamaica (3)
- Japan (9)
- Kenya (9)
- Mauritius (1)
- Morocco (6)
- Netherlands (6)
- New Zealand (3)
- North Yemen (2)
- Norway (8)
- Poland (6)
- Portugal (9)
- Rwanda (1)
- Soviet Union (6)
- Spain (9)
- Sweden (8)
- Switzerland (1)
- Turkey (2)
- United Kingdom (9)
- United States (9)
- Venezuela (2)

== See also ==
- 1989 IAAF World Cross Country Championships – Junior men's race
- 1989 IAAF World Cross Country Championships – Senior women's race
- 1989 IAAF World Cross Country Championships – Junior women's race
