= 1988 IAAF World Cross Country Championships – Senior men's race =

Senior men's race at the 1988 IAAF World Cross Country Championships
- Organisers: IAAF
- Edition: 16th
- Date: March 26
- Host city: Auckland, New Zealand
- Venue: Ellerslie Racecourse
- Events: 1
- Distances: 12 km – Senior men
- Participation: 204 athletes from 35 nations

The Senior men's race at the 1988 IAAF World Cross Country Championships was held in Auckland, New Zealand, at the Ellerslie Racecourse on March 26, 1988. A report on the event was given in the Glasgow Herald.

Complete results, medallists, and the results of British athletes were published.

== Race results ==
=== Senior men's race (12 km) ===
==== Individual ====
Rank	Athlete	Country	Time
1st place, gold medalist(s)	John Ngugi	Kenya	34:32
2nd place, silver medalist(s)	Paul Kipkoech	Kenya	34:54
3rd place, bronze medalist(s)	Kipsubai Koskei	Kenya	35:07
4	Boniface Merande	Kenya	35:22
5	Abebe Mekonnen	Ethiopia	35:25
6	Moses Tanui	Kenya	35:25
7	Joseph Kiptum	Kenya	35:46
8	Kip Rono	Kenya	35:46
9	Some Muge	Kenya	35:48
10	Haji Bulbula	Ethiopia	35:49
11	Paul Arpin	France	35:51
12	Habte Negash	Ethiopia	35:54
13	Roger Hackney	United Kingdom	35:59
14	Steve Tunstall	France	36:04
15	John Woods	Ireland	36:07
16	Domingos Castro	Portugal	36:12
17	Jean-Louis Prianon	France	36:12
18	Tommy Ekblom	Finland	36:14
19	Kozu Akutsu	Japan	36:15
20	Debebe Demisse	Ethiopia	36:15
21	Steve Moneghetti	Australia	36:16
22	Giuseppe Miccoli	Italy	36:19
23	Melese Feissa	Ethiopia	36:23
24	Alejandro Gómez	Spain	36:24
25	Joël Lucas	France	36:24
26	Joaquim Pinheiro	Portugal	36:25
27	Steve Binns	United Kingdom	36:26
28	Pat Porter	United States	36:26
29	Antonio Prieto	Spain	36:28
30	Cyrille Laventure	France	36:29
31	Harry Green	United States	36:30
32	Jamie Harrison	Australia	36:32
33	Chala Kelele	Ethiopia	36:33
34	David Buzza	United Kingdom	36:34
35	Salvatore Antibo	Italy	36:35
36	John Campbell	New Zealand	36:35
37	Bruno Levant	France	36:37
38	Tena Negere	Ethiopia	36:39
39	Thierry Pantel	France	36:41
40	Vicente Polo	Spain	36:43
41	Antonio Serrano	Spain	36:45
42	John Andrews	Australia	36:45
43	Eamonn Martin	United Kingdom	36:46
44	Malcolm Norwood	Australia	36:46
45	Derrick Lakeman	United States	36:47
46	George Nicholas	United States	36:47
47	Antonio Silio	Argentina	36:47
48	José Manuel Albentosa	Spain	36:48
49	Salvatore Bettiol	Italy	36:49
50	João de Sousa	Brazil	36:50
51	Franco Boffi	Italy	36:55
52	Francesco Panetta	Italy	36:57
53	Mark Dalloway	United Kingdom	36:58
54	Zhang Guowei	China	36:59
55	Kazuya Wakakura	Japan	36:59
56	Dominique Delattre	France	37:00
57	Lars-Erik Nilsson	Sweden	37:01
58	Andy Bristow	United Kingdom	37:02
59	John Halvorsen	Norway	37:03
60	José Regalo	Portugal	37:05
61	Adauto Domingues	Brazil	37:05
62	Jeff Cannada	United States	37:06
63	Raffaello Alliegro	Italy	37:07
64	Wolde Silasse Melkessa	Ethiopia	37:08
65	Mahieddine Belhadj	Algeria	37:09
66	Masaru Matsuda	Japan	37:10
67	Martti Vainio	Finland	37:12
68	Kazuya Nishimoto	Japan	37:14
69	El Hachami Abdenouz	Algeria	37:15
70	Aissa Remel	Algeria	37:16
71	Fernando Mamede	Portugal	37:16
72	Eliseo Rios	Portugal	37:16
73	Arthur Waddle	United States	37:16
74	Chris Pilone	New Zealand	37:17
75	Brad Camp	Australia	37:18
76	Jonathan Richards	United Kingdom	37:18
77	John Bowden	New Zealand	37:19
78	Pat Carroll	Australia	37:19
79	Stanley Mandebele	Zimbabwe	37:19
80	Martin Stock	Australia	37:20
81	Artur Castro	Brazil	37:22
82	Konrad Dobler	West Germany	37:23
83	Bekele Debele	Ethiopia	37:25
84	Dov Kremer	Israel	37:26
85	Allan Zachariasen	Denmark	37:26
86	Peter Van de Kerkhove	Belgium	37:27
87	Werner Mory	Belgium	37:28
88	Mark Stickley	United States	37:29
89	Ralf Salzmann	West Germany	37:30
90	Tom Birnie	New Zealand	37:31
91	Henrique Crisostomo	Portugal	37:32
92	Dave Taylor	Ireland	37:33
93	Gerry Curtis	Ireland	37:34
94	Phillip Clode	New Zealand	37:34
95	Juan José Rosario	Spain	37:35
96	Robert Schneider	West Germany	37:36
97	Doug Cronkite	Canada	37:38
98	Jos Maes	Belgium	37:38
99	Daniel Mutai	Kenya	37:39
100	António Pinto	Portugal	37:39
101	Ranieri Carenza	Italy	37:40
102	Craig Virgin	United States	37:40
103	Chris Tobin	New Zealand	37:40
104	Roy Dooney	Ireland	37:42
105	Peter Brett	Australia	37:42
106	Carey Nelson	Canada	37:43
107	Darren Klassen	Canada	37:43
108	Paul McCloy	Canada	37:44
109	Chris Robison	United Kingdom	37:51
110	Derek Froude	New Zealand	37:52
111	Håvard Tveite	Norway	37:54
112	Brendan Quinn	Ireland	37:56
113	Patric Nilsson	Sweden	37:57
114	Danvir Singh	India	37:57
115	Sanshiro Kasama	Japan	38:00
116	Miloud Djellal	Algeria	38:01
117	Rod Dixon	New Zealand	38:03
118	Marius Hasler	Switzerland	38:04
119	Constantino Esparcia	Spain	38:05
120	Lasmani Merzougui	Algeria	38:05
121	Ivo Rodrigues	Brazil	38:05
122	Eberhard Weyel	West Germany	38:06
123	Eirik Hansen	Norway	38:07
124	Benny Pollentier	Belgium	38:09
125	Kazuhito Yamada	Japan	38:10
126	Marco Gozzano	Italy	38:11
127	John Treacy	Ireland	38:12
128	Abbès Téhami	Algeria	38:12
129	Helge Dolsvåg	Norway	38:13
130	Francisco Sánchez	Spain	38:14
131	Richard O'Flynn	Ireland	38:22
132	John Bolger	Canada	38:23
133	Gurbachan Singh	India	38:25
134	Guo Yijiang	China	38:27
135	Deon McNeilly	United Kingdom	38:28
136	Damiao Silva	Brazil	38:29
137	Udai Pratap Singh	India	38:29
138	Pär Wallin	Sweden	38:32
139	Thomas Sørensen	Denmark	38:33
140	David O'Keefe	United States	38:34
141	Elói Schleder	Brazil	38:36
142	Peter Govaerts	Belgium	38:38
143	Vijay Kumar Mishra	India	38:39
144	Ari Paunonen	Finland	38:40
145	Axel Hardy	West Germany	38:45
146	Pierre Levisse	France	38:46
147	Niels Kim Hjorth	Denmark	38:48
148	Jari Venäläinen	Finland	38:56
149	Stig Nørregaard	Denmark	38:56
150	El Hadj Mendes	Algeria	38:59
151	Satoshi Kato	Japan	39:01
152	Arnold Mächler	Switzerland	39:05
153	Norman Tinkham	Canada	39:07
154	Jan Ikov	Denmark	39:09
155	Jörgen Salo	Finland	39:12
156	Truls Nygaard	Norway	39:13
157	Michael Halvorsen	Denmark	39:13
158	Engelbert Franz	West Germany	39:16
159	Herman Decoux	Belgium	39:16
160	Lars Bøgh	Denmark	39:26
161	Abdelrazzak Bounour	Algeria	39:28
162	Svein Erik Eide	Norway	39:29
163	Peder Poulsen	Sweden	39:35
164	Allen Hugli	Canada	39:38
165	Alain Boucher	Canada	39:44
166	E. Rajender	India	39:44
167	Hirozumi Kato	Japan	40:02
168	Zephaniah Ncube	Zimbabwe	40:19
169	Marcelo Cascabelo	Argentina	40:21
170	Shivkumar Shreshta	India	40:21
171	Ken Moloney	New Zealand	40:28
172	Anna Durai	India	40:30
173	Hsu Gi-Sheng	Chinese Taipei	40:35
174	Chou Hsien-Kuang	Chinese Taipei	40:39
175	Julio César Gómez	Argentina	40:42
176	Michel Jean-Louis	Mauritius	40:58
177	Abel Antón	Spain	41:20
178	Baikuntha Manandhar	Nepal	41:27
179	Tim Soutar	Hong Kong	41:32
180	Shri Chand	Fiji	41:56
181	Cordova Simon	Antigua and Barbuda	41:57
182	Wong Chung Man	Hong Kong	42:02
183	Krishna Bahadur Basnet	Nepal	42:30
184	Lee Yin-Sheng	Chinese Taipei	42:32
185	Bobby Singh	Fiji	42:46
186	Dac Bahadur Thapa	Nepal	43:14
187	Fitzroy Browne	Antigua and Barbuda	43:35
188	Davendra Pradesh Singh	Fiji	43:56
189	Ganesh Prasad	Fiji	44:34
190	Vikash Kumar Singh	Fiji	44:47
191	Chandra Bahadur Gurung	Nepal	44:47
192	Moses Zarak Khan	Fiji	44:58
193	Hari Bahadur Barwal	Nepal	45:20
194	Semi Vuetibau	Fiji	45:40
195	John Lorri	Vanuatu	46:13
196	Pushpa Raj Ojha	Nepal	46:16
197	Ashok Kumar	Fiji	47:12
198	Samuelu Samuelu	Western Samoa	48:41
199	Esau Polutu	Western Samoa	49:10
—	Ezequiel Canario	Portugal	DNF
—	Dionísio Castro	Portugal	DNF
—	Rob de Castella	Australia	DNF
—	Stefano Mei	Italy	DNF
—	Risto Ulmala	Finland	DNF

==== Teams ====
Rank	Team	Points
1st place, gold medalist(s)	Kenya: John Ngugi / 1; Paul Kipkoech / 2; Kipsubai Koskei / 3; Boniface Merande / 4; Moses Tanui / 6; Joseph Kiptum / 7; (Kip Rono) / (8); (Some Muge) / (9); (Daniel Mutai) / (99)	23
2nd place, silver medalist(s)	Ethiopia: Abebe Mekonnen / 5; Haji Bulbula / 10; Habte Negash / 12; Debebe Demisse / 20; Melese Feissa / 23; Chala Kelele / 33; (Tena Negere) / (38); (Wolde Silasse Melkessa) / (64); (Bekele Debele) / (83)	103
3rd place, bronze medalist(s)	France: Paul Arpin / 11; Steve Tunstall / 14; Jean-Louis Prianon / 17; Joël Lucas / 25; Cyrille Laventure / 30; Bruno Levant / 37; (Thierry Pantel) / (39); (Dominique Delattre) / (56); (Pierre Levisse) / (146)	134
4	United Kingdom: Roger Hackney / 13; Steve Binns / 27; David Buzza / 34; Eamonn Martin / 43; Mark Dalloway / 53; Andy Bristow / 58; (Jonathan Richards) / (76); (Chris Robison) / (109); (Deon McNeilly) / (135)	228
5	Italy: Giuseppe Miccoli / 22; Salvatore Antibo / 35; Salvatore Bettiol / 49; Franco Boffi / 51; Francesco Panetta / 52; Raffaello Alliegro / 63; (Ranieri Carenza) / (101); (Marco Gozzano) / (126); (Stefano Mei) / (DNF)	272
6	Spain: Alejandro Gómez / 24; Antonio Prieto / 29; Vicente Polo / 40; Antonio Serrano / 41; José Manuel Albentosa / 48; Juan José Rosario / 95; (Constantino Esparcia) / (119); (Francisco Sánchez) / (130); (Abel Antón) / (177)	277
7	United States: Pat Porter / 28; Harry Green / 31; Derrick Lakeman / 45; George Nicholas / 46; Jeff Cannada / 62; Arthur Waddle / 73; (Mark Stickley) / (88); (Craig Virgin) / (102); (David O'Keefe) / (140)	285
8	Australia: Steve Moneghetti / 21; Jamie Harrison / 32; John Andrews / 42; Malcolm Norwood / 44; Brad Camp / 75; Pat Carroll / 78; (Martin Stock) / (80); (Peter Brett) / (105); (Rob de Castella) / (DNF)	292
9	Portugal: Domingos Castro / 16; Joaquim Pinheiro / 26; José Regalo / 60; Fernando Mamede / 71; Eliseo Rios / 72; Henrique Crisostomo / 91; (António Pinto) / (100); (Ezequiel Canario) / (DNF); (Dionísio Castro) / (DNF)	336
10	Japan: Kozu Akutsu / 19; Kazuya Wakakura / 55; Masaru Matsuda / 66; Kazuya Nishimoto / 68; Sanshiro Kasama / 115; Kazuhito Yamada / 125; (Satoshi Kato) / (151); (Hirozumi Kato) / (167)	448
11	New Zealand: John Campbell / 36; Chris Pilone / 74; John Bowden / 77; Tom Birnie / 90; Phillip Clode / 94; Chris Tobin / 103; (Derek Froude) / (110); (Rod Dixon) / (117); (Ken Moloney) / (171)	474
12	Ireland: John Woods / 15; Dave Taylor / 92; Gerry Curtis / 93; Roy Dooney / 104; Brendan Quinn / 112; John Treacy / 127; (Richard O'Flynn) / (131)	543
13	Algeria: Mahieddine Belhadj / 65; El Hachami Abdenouz / 69; Aissa Remel / 70; Miloud Djellal / 116; Lasmani Merzougui / 120; Abbès Téhami / 128; (El Hadj Mendes) / (150); (Abdelrazzak Bounour) / (161)	568
14	Brazil: João de Sousa / 50; Adauto Domingues / 61; Artur Castro / 81; Ivo Rodrigues / 121; Damiao Silva / 136; Elói Schleder / 141	590
15	West Germany: Konrad Dobler / 82; Ralf Salzmann / 89; Robert Schneider / 96; Eberhard Weyel / 122; Axel Hardy / 145; Engelbert Franz / 158	692
16	Belgium: Peter Van de Kerkhove / 86; Werner Mory / 87; Jos Maes / 98; Benny Pollentier / 124; Peter Govaerts / 142; Herman Decoux / 159	696
17	Canada: Doug Cronkite / 97; Carey Nelson / 106; Darren Klassen / 107; Paul McCloy / 108; John Bolger / 132; Norman Tinkham / 153; (Allen Hugli) / (164); (Alain Boucher) / (165)	703
18	Norway: John Halvorsen / 59; Håvard Tveite / 111; Eirik Hansen / 123; Helge Dolsvåg / 129; Truls Nygaard / 156; Svein Erik Eide / 162	740
19	Denmark: Allan Zachariasen / 85; Thomas Sørensen / 139; Niels Kim Hjorth / 147; Stig Nørregaard / 149; Jan Ikov / 154; Michael Halvorsen / 157; (Lars Bøgh) / (160)	831
20	India: Danvir Singh / 114; Gurbachan Singh / 133; Udai Pratap Singh / 137; Vijay Kumar Mishra / 143; E. Rajender / 166; Shivkumar Shreshta / 170; (Anna Durai) / (172)	863
21	Fiji: Shri Chand / 180; Bobby Singh / 185; Davendra Pradesh Singh / 188; Ganesh Prasad / 189; Vikash Kumar Singh / 190; Moses Zarak Khan / 192; (Semi Vuetibau) / (194); (Ashok Kumar) / (197)	1124
22	Nepal: Baikuntha Manandhar / 178; Krishna Bahadur Basnet / 183; Dac Bahadur Thapa / 186; Chandra Bahadur Gurung / 191; Hari Bahadur Barwal / 193; Pushpa Raj Ojha / 196	1127
DNF	Finland: Tommy Ekblom / (18); Martti Vainio / (67); Ari Paunonen / (144); Jari Venäläinen / (148); Jörgen Salo / (155); Risto Ulmala / (DNF)	DNF

- Note: Athletes in parentheses did not score for the team result

== Participation ==
An unofficial count yields the participation of 204 athletes from 35 countries in the Senior men's race, two athletes less than the official number published.

- Algeria (8)
- Antigua and Barbuda (2)
- Argentina (3)
- Australia (9)
- Belgium (6)
- Brazil (6)
- Canada (8)
- China (2)
- Chinese Taipei (3)
- Denmark (7)
- Ethiopia (9)
- Fiji (8)
- Finland (6)
- France (9)
- Hong Kong (2)
- India (7)
- Ireland (7)
- Israel (1)
- Italy (9)
- Japan (8)
- Kenya (9)
- Mauritius (1)
- Nepal (6)
- New Zealand (9)
- Norway (6)
- Portugal (9)
- Spain (9)
- Sweden (4)
- Switzerland (2)
- United Kingdom (9)
- United States (9)
- Vanuatu (1)
- Western Samoa (2)
- West Germany (6)
- Zimbabwe (2)

== See also ==
- 1988 IAAF World Cross Country Championships – Junior men's race
- 1988 IAAF World Cross Country Championships – Senior women's race
