= Athletics at the 1988 Summer Olympics – Men's 10,000 metres =

Men's 10,000 metres at the Games of the XXIV Olympiad
- Venue: Olympic Stadium
- Dates: 23 September 1988 (heats); 26 September 1988 (final)
- Competitors: 51 from 36 nations
- Winning time: 27:21.48 OR

Medalists
| 1st place, gold medalist(s) | | Brahim Boutayeb; Morocco |
| 2nd place, silver medalist(s) | | Salvatore Antibo; Italy |
| 3rd place, bronze medalist(s) | | Kipkemboi Kimeli; Kenya |

The men's 10,000 metres at the 1988 Summer Olympics in Seoul, South Korea had an entry list of 52 competitors, with two qualifying heats (52) before the final (20) took place on Monday September 26, 1988. The winning margin was 2.09 seconds.

Through the halfway mark, Kipkemboi Kimeli was pushing the pace close to the world record, marked by Brahim Boutayeb. Only Moses Tanui and trailing off the back Salvatore Antibo managed to stay in contact. More than 60 metres back, Arturo Barrios led the chase pack. As Tanui came up behind Boutayeb to tighten the lead group of three, Boutayeb went around Kimeli. The two Kenyans ran together in chase for part of a lap then Tanui was unable to keep up with the accelerated pace. Kimeli managed to keep close to Boutayeb but ever so slightly was losing ground. As Tanui faded, Antibo accelerated to move himself into a stronger medal position. By 5 laps to go, Antibo closed down on Kimeli. The two were jockeying for the position, Antibo first sprinting past Kimeli, then Kimeli accelerating away from Antibo. Boutayeb entered the last lap with a 20-metre lead and ran the last lap checking behind him. Coming down the home stretch, realizing the world record was out of reach, he slowed the last 30 metres and celebrated, blowing kisses to the crowd. Behind him, Antibo made one more move, sprinting around Kimeli, sprinting for home for the silver. Kimeli was unable to respond and cruised home for bronze still more than eleven seconds up on Jean-Louis Prianon and the best sprinting efforts of the rest of the pack.

== Medalists ==
| Gold | Brahim Boutayeb; Morocco |
| Silver | Salvatore Antibo; Italy |
| Bronze | Kipkemboi Kimeli; Kenya |

== Records ==
These were the standing world and Olympic records (in minutes) prior to the 1988 Summer Olympics.

| World record | 27:13.81 | (Portugal) Fernando Mamede | Stockholm (SWE) | July 2, 1984 |
| Olympic record | 27:38.35 | (Finland) Lasse Virén | Munich (FRG) | September 3, 1972 |

The following Olympic record (in minutes) was set during this competition.

| Date | Event | Athlete | Time | OR | WR |
|---|---|---|---|---|---|
| September 26, 1988 | Final | Brahim Boutayeb (MAR) | 27:21.46 | OR | |

== Final ==
| RANK | FINAL | TIME |
|---|---|---|
| | Brahim Boutayeb (MAR) | 27:21.46 |
| | Salvatore Antibo (ITA) | 27:23.55 |
| | Kipkemboi Kimeli (KEN) | 27:25.16 |
| 4. | Jean-Louis Prianon (FRA) | 27:36.43 |
| 5. | Arturo Barrios (MEX) | 27:39.32 |
| 6. | Hansjörg Kunze (GDR) | 27:39.35 |
| 7. | Paul Arpin (FRA) | 27:39.36 |
| 8. | Moses Tanui (KEN) | 27:47.23 |
| 9. | Marti ten Kate (NED) | 27:50.30 |
| 10. | Antonio Prieto (ESP) | 27:52.78 |
| 11. | Mauricio González (MEX) | 27:59.90 |
| 12. | Evgeni Ignatov (BUL) | 28:09.32 |
| 13. | António Pinto (POR) | 28:09.53 |
| 14. | Kozu Akutsu (JPN) | 28:09.70 |
| 15. | Rolando Vera (ECU) | 28:17.64 |
| 16. | John Halvorsen (NOR) | 28:39.35 |
| 17. | Shuichi Yoneshige (JPN) | 29:04.44 |
| 18. | Bruce Bickford (USA) | 29:09.74 |
| – | Boniface Merande (KEN) | DNF |
| – | Eamonn Martin (GBR) | DNF |

== Non-qualifiers ==
| RANK | QUALIFYING HEATS | TIME |
|---|---|---|
| 21. | Ezequiel Canario (POR) | 28:43.02 |
| 22. | Alberto Cova (ITA) | 28:43.84 |
| 23. | Pat Porter (USA) | 28:45.04 |
| 24. | Steve Binns (GBR) | 28:52.88 |
| 25. | Antonio Serrano (ESP) | 29:01.13 |
| 26. | Musa Ahmed Joda (SUD) | 29:03.87 |
| 27. | Pedro Ortiz (COL) | 29:08.25 |
| 28. | Marcos Barreto (MEX) | 29:18.14 |
| 29. | Boay Akonay (TAN) | 29:19.06 |
| 30. | Paul McCloy (CAN) | 29:34.07 |
| 31. | Lee Sang-geun (KOR) | 29:37.14 |
| 32. | Ahmed Ebrahim Warsama (QAT) | 29:37.99 |
| 33. | Stanley Mandebele (ZIM) | 29:50.99 |
| 34. | Eduardus Nabunome (INA) | 29:55.23 |
| 35. | Talal Omar Abdillahi (DJI) | 30:08.53 |
| 36. | Policarpio Calizaya (BOL) | 30:35.01 |
| 37. | Ismael Yaya (CHA) | 30:47.29 (NR) |
| 38. | Haribahadur Rokaya (NEP) | 30:48.16 |
| 39. | Charles Naveko (MAW) | 31:23.53 |
| 40. | Abdul Karim Daoud (YAR) | 32:33.04 |
| 41. | Aaron Dupnai (PNG) | 32:50.63 |
| 42. | Bineshwar Prasad (FIJ) | 33:30.43 |
| 43. | John Maeke (SOL) | 35:16.93 |
| – | Jose Manuel Albentosa (ESP) | DNF |
| – | Dionisio Castro (POR) | DNF |
| – | Andrew Lloyd (AUS) | DNF |
| – | Paul Williams (CAN) | DNF |
| – | Mike McLeod (GBR) | DNF |
| – | Kamana Koji (ZAI) | DNF |
| – | Tsukasa Endo (JPN) | DNF |
| – | Steve Plasencia (USA) | DNF |
| – | Martin Vrábel (TCH) | DNF |

== See also ==
- 1987 Men's World Championships 10.000 metres (Rome)
- 1991 Men's World Championships 10.000 metres (Tokyo)
