= 1990 European Athletics Championships – Men's 10,000 metres =

Men's 10,000 metres at the European Athletics Championships

These are the official results of the Men's 10,000 metres event at the 1990 European Championships in Split, Yugoslavia. The final was held at Stadion Poljud on 27 August 1990.

== Medalists ==
Gold	Salvatore Antibo; Italy
Silver	Are Nakkim; Norway
Bronze	Stefano Mei; Italy

== Final ==
Rank	Final	Time
	Salvatore Antibo (ITA)	27:41.27
	Are Nakkim (NOR)	28:04.04
	Stefano Mei (ITA)	28:04.46
4.	Antonio Prieto (ESP)	28:05.35
5.	Richard Nerurkar (GBR)	28:07.81
6.	José Manuel Albentosa (ESP)	28:11.00
7.	Ezequiel Canario (POR)	28:11.95
8.	Marti ten Kate (NED)	28:12.53
9.	Zoltán Káldy (HUN)	28:13.71
10.	Alejandro Gómez Cabral (ESP)	28:16.06
11.	Dietmar Millonig (AUT)	28:16.95
12.	John Halvorsen (NOR)	28:17.40
13.	Jean-Louis Prianon (FRA)	28:21.71
14.	António Pinto (POR)	28:26.68
15.	Spyros Andriopoulos (GRE)	28:28.95
16.	Giuseppe Miccoli (ITA)	28:29.57
17.	Paul Arpin (FRA)	28:38.67
18.	Colin Moore (GBR)	28:59.00
19.	Harri Hänninen (FIN)	29:07.53
20.	Raf Wijns (BEL)	29:09.74
21.	Aleksandr Burtsev (URS)	29:16.26
22.	Carsten Eich (GDR)	30:21.03
—	Evgeni Ignatov (BUL)	DNF
—	Thierry Pantel (FRA)	DNF
—	Sławomir Majusiak (POL)	DNF

== Participation ==
According to an unofficial count, 25 athletes from 16 countries participated in the event.

- Austria (1)
- Belgium (1)
- Bulgaria (1)
- East Germany (1)
- Finland (1)
- France (3)
- Greece (1)
- Hungary (1)
- Italy (3)
- Netherlands (1)
- Norway (2)
- Poland (1)
- Portugal (2)
- Soviet Union (1)
- Spain (3)
- United Kingdom (2)

== See also ==
- 1988 Men's Olympic 10,000 metres (Seoul)
- 1991 Men's World Championships 10,000 metres (Tokyo)
- 1992 Men's Olympic 10,000 metres (Barcelona)
