= Athletics at the 1992 Summer Olympics – Men's 10,000 metres =

Men's 10,000 metres at the Games of the XXV Olympiad
- Venue: Estadi Olímpic de Montjuïc
- Date: 31 July 1992 (heats); 3 August 1992 (final)
- Competitors: 56 from 39 nations
- Winning time: 27:46.70

Medalists
1st place, gold medalist(s)		Khalid Skah; Morocco
2nd place, silver medalist(s)		Richard Chelimo; Kenya
3rd place, bronze medalist(s)		Addis Abebe; Ethiopia

These are the official results of the men's 10,000 metres event at the 1992 Summer Olympics in Barcelona, Spain. There were a total number of 56 participating athletes. Khalid Skah from Morocco dueled with Richard Chelimo from Kenya during much of the race. It was a sprint finish over the last 150 meters, Skah pulled ahead and crossed the finish line 1.02 seconds in front of Chelimo.

== Controversy ==
The Kenyans protested the finish, claiming that lapped Moroccan runner Hammou Boutayeb joined the lead pack of Chelimo and Skah with 3 laps to go in the race, apparently trying to help Skah. Boutayeb kept running in front of Chelimo and slowing down, causing him to miss his stride. Competition Rule 143.2 states that a lapped runner may not "assist" another runner. The race jury temporarily disqualified Skah for receiving assistance from Boutayeb. The Moroccans appealed to the Jury of Appeal of the International Amateur Athletic Federation. Since Rule 143.2 did not give any penalty for its violation, the Jury of Appeal reinstated Skah. With one lap to go, a meet referee actually pushed Boutayeb, trying to tell him to get out of the way. Ultimately the race was decided by Skah out sprinting Chelimo head to head on the final straight.

== Medalists ==
Gold	Khalid Skah; Morocco
Silver	Richard Chelimo; Kenya
Bronze	Addis Abebe; Ethiopia

== Records ==
These were the standing world and Olympic records (in minutes) prior to the 1992 Summer Olympics.

World record	27:08.23	(Mexico) Arturo Barrios	West Berlin (FRG)	August 18, 1989
Olympic record	27:21.46	(Morocco) Brahim Boutayeb	Seoul (KOR)	September 26, 1988

== Final ==
- Held on August 3, 1992

RANK	FINAL	TIME
	Khalid Skah (MAR)	27:46.70
	Richard Chelimo (KEN)	27:47.72
	Addis Abebe (ETH)	28:00.07
4.	Salvatore Antibo (ITA)	28:11.39
5.	Arturo Barrios (MEX)	28:17.79
6.	Germán Silva (MEX)	28:20.19
7.	William Koech (KEN)	28:25.18
8.	Moses Tanui (KEN)	28:27.11
9.	Fita Bayisa (ETH)	28:27.68
10.	Todd Williams (USA)	28:29.38
11.	Paul Evans (GBR)	28:29.83
12.	Zoltán Káldy (HUN)	28:34.21
13.	Xolile Yawa (RSA)	28:37.18
14.	Haruo Urata (JPN)	28:37.61
15.	António Martins Bordelo (FRA)	28:47.66
16.	Armando Quintanilla (MEX)	28:48.05
17.	Richard Nerurkar (GBR)	28:48.48
18.	Antonio Silio (ARG)	28:55.20
19.	John Halvorsen (NOR)	29:53.91
—	Hammou Boutayeb (MAR)	DQ

== Heats ==
RANK	HEAT 1	TIME
1.	William Koech (KEN)	28:06.86
2.	Germán Silva (MEX)	28:13.72
3.	Paul Evans (GBR)	28:15.70
4.	Addis Abebe (ETH)	28:15.76
5.	Richard Chelimo (KEN)	28:16.39
6.	Khalid Skah (MAR)	28:18.48
7.	Salvatore Antibo (ITA)	28:18.48
8.	John Halvorsen (NOR)	28:21.57
9.	Zoltán Káldy (HUN)	28:21.96
10.	Armando Quintanilla (MEX)	28:23.76
11.	Haruo Urata (JPN)	28:24.08
12.	Oleg Strizhakov (EUN)	28:35.97
13.	Steve Plasencia (USA)	28:45.59
14.	Stéphane Franke (GER)	28:52.83
15.	Carlos de la Torre (ESP)	28:55.47
16.	Sean Dollman (IRL)	28:55.77
17.	Paul Williams (CAN)	29:01.67
18.	Tendai Chimusasa (ZIM)	29:17.26
19.	Juan José Castillo (PER)	30:04.60
20.	Miguel Vargas (CRC)	30:13.06
21.	Patrick Rama (LES)	30:21.69
22.	Awwad Al-Hasini (JOR)	30:43.19
—	Thierry Pantel (FRA)	DNF
—	Risto Ulmala (FIN)	DNF
—	Alejandro Gómez Cabral (ESP)	DNF
—	Abdullah Al-Dosari (BRN)	DNF
—	Domingos Castro (POR)	DNF
—	Mohamedou Sid'Ahmed (MTN)	DNF

RANK	HEAT 2	TIME
1.	Fita Bayisa (ETH)	28:23.55
2.	Moses Tanui (KEN)	28:24.07
3.	Richard Nerurkar (GBR)	28:24.35
4.	Hammou Boutayeb (MAR)	28:25.73
5.	Todd Williams (USA)	28:26.32
6.	Arturo Barrios (MEX)	28:28.26
7.	Xolile Yawa (RSA)	28:28.78
8.	Antonio Silio (ARG)	28:31.02
9.	António Martins Bordelo (FRA)	28:35.13
10.	Francesco Bennici (ITA)	28:45.62
11.	José Carlos Adan (ESP)	28:50.38
12.	Mathias Ntawulikura (RWA)	28:51.79
13.	Aaron Ramirez (USA)	29:00.12
14.	Sakae Osaki (JPN)	29:20.01
15.	Fernando Couto (POR)	29:20.06
16.	Carsten Eich (GER)	29:22.19
17.	Noel Berkeley (IRL)	29:23.58
18.	Vincent Rousseau (BEL)	29:25.68
19.	Eamonn Martin (GBR)	29:35.65
20.	Isaac Simelan (SWZ)	29:48.49
21.	John Mwathiwa (MAW)	29:54.26
22.	Herder Herberto Vasquez (COL)	30:07.55
23.	Eddy Punina (ECU)	30:19.76
24.	Policarpio Calizaya (BOL)	30:27.01
25.	Omar Daher Gadid (DJI)	30:32.89
26.	Khalid Al-Estashi (YEM)	30:49.58 (NR)
27.	Marlon Williams (ISV)	31:22.13
28.	Bineshwar Prasad (FIJ)	31:46.19

== See also ==
- 1991 Men's World Championships 10.000 metres (Tokyo)
- 1993 Men's World Championship 10.000 metres (Stuttgart)
