= 1991 World Championships in Athletics – Men's 10,000 metres =

The men's 10,000 metres event featured at the 1991 World Championships in Tokyo, Japan. There were a total number of 40 participating athletes, with two qualifying heats and the final being held on 26 August 1991.

== Final ==
| RANK | FINAL | TIME |
|---|---|---|
| | Moses Tanui (KEN) | 27:38.74 |
| | Richard Chelimo (KEN) | 27:39.41 |
| | Khalid Skah (MAR) | 27:41.74 |
| 4. | Thomas Osano (KEN) | 27:53.66 |
| 5. | Richard Nerurkar (GBR) | 27:57.14 |
| 6. | Aloÿs Nizigama (BDI) | 28:00.03 |
| 7. | Mathias Ntawulikura (RWA) | 28:10.38 |
| 8. | Hammou Boutayeb (MAR) | 28:12.77 |
| 9. | Alejandro Gómez (ESP) | 28:13.14 |
| 10. | Koichi Morishita (JPN) | 28:13.71 |
| 11. | Haruo Urata (JPN) | 28:18.15 |
| 12. | Stéphane Franke (GER) | 28:20.00 |
| 13. | Addis Abebe (ETH) | 28:33.44 |
| 14. | Marti ten Kate (NED) | 28:33.49 |
| 15. | Eamonn Martin (GBR) | 28:35.82 |
| 16. | Andy Bristow (GBR) | 28:47.01 |
| 17. | Aaron Ramirez (USA) | 28:47.56 |
| 18. | Fernando Couto (POR) | 28:48.05 |
| 19. | Katsumi Ikeda (JPN) | 28:50.25 |
| 20. | Salvatore Antibo (ITA) | 28:52.41 |

== Qualifying heats ==
- Held on Saturday 1991-08-24

| RANK | HEAT 1 | TIME |
|---|---|---|
| 1. | Khalid Skah (MAR) | 28:23.28 |
| 2. | Eamonn Martin (GBR) | 28:23.42 |
| 3. | Thomas Osano (KEN) | 28:23.56 |
| 4. | Mathias Ntawulikura (RWA) | 28:23.75 |
| 5. | Aloÿs Nizigama (BDI) | 28:23.80 |
| 6. | Aaron Ramirez (USA) | 28:24.52 |
| 7. | Haruo Urata (JPN) | 28:24.70 |
| 8. | Moses Tanui (KEN) | 28:25.52 |
| 9. | Stéphane Franke (GER) | 28:30.13 |
| 10. | Koichi Morishita (JPN) | 28:34.29 |
| 11. | Geraldo Francisco de Assis (BRA) | 28:51.25 |
| 12. | Antonio Prieto (ESP) | 28:57.28 |
| 13. | Carey Nelson (CAN) | 29:07.27 |
| 14. | John Mwathiwa (MAW) | 30:31.43 |
| 15. | Tsuluunbaatar Ariunsaikhan (MGL) | 30:50.77 |
| 16. | Gerard de Gaetano (MLT) | 31:03.21 |
| 17. | Elonga Lucas Eningo (GEQ) | 35:31.57 |
| — | John Halvorsen (NOR) | DNF |
| — | Antonio Silio (ARG) | DNF |
| — | Arturo Barrios (MEX) | DNF |

| RANK | HEAT 2 | TIME |
|---|---|---|
| 1. | Addis Abebe (ETH) | 28:23.77 |
| 2. | Richard Chelimo (KEN) | 28:23.79 |
| 3. | Richard Nerurkar (GBR) | 28:24.03 |
| 4. | Katsumi Ikeda (JPN) | 28:26.14 |
| 5. | Hammou Boutayeb (MAR) | 28:26.54 |
| 6. | Salvatore Antibo (ITA) | 28:26.72 |
| 7. | Fernando Couto (POR) | 28:27.56 |
| 8. | Alejandro Gómez (ESP) | 28:29.37 |
| 9. | Marti ten Kate (NED) | 28:31.66 |
| 10. | Andy Bristow (GBR) | 28:41.60 |
| 11. | Steve Plasencia (USA) | 28:47.13 |
| 12. | Jesús Herrera (MEX) | 28:59.22 |
| 13. | Vincent Rousseau (BEL) | 28:59.34 |
| 14. | Zoltán Káldy (HUN) | 29:00.89 |
| 15. | José Manuel Albentosa (ESP) | 29:20.92 |
| 16. | Ahmed Al-Hamshani (JOR) | 31:13.52 |
| — | Manny Lolin (MAS) | DNF |
| — | Silvio Guerra (ECU) | DNS |
| — | Miguel Angel Vargas (CRC) | DNS |
| — | Manuel Moreno (CPV) | DNS |

== See also ==
- 1990 Men's European Championships 10.000 metres (Split)
- 1992 Men's Olympic 10.000 metres (Barcelona)
- 1993 Men's World Championships 10.000 metres (Stuttgart)
