= 1985 IAAF World Cross Country Championships – Junior men's race =

Junior men's race at the 1985 IAAF World Cross Country Championships
- Organisers: IAAF
- Edition: 13th
- Date: March 24
- Host city: Lisbon, Portugal
- Venue: Sports Complex of Jamor
- Events: 1
- Distances: 8.19 km – Junior men
- Participation: 141 athletes from 35 nations

The Junior men's race at the 1985 IAAF World Cross Country Championships was held in Lisbon, Portugal, at the Sports Complex of Jamor on March 24, 1985. A report on the event was given in the Glasgow Herald.

Complete results, medallists, and the results of British athletes were published.

== Race results ==
=== Junior men's race (8.19 km) ===
==== Individual ====
Rank	Athlete	Country	Time
1st place, gold medalist(s)	Kipkemboi Kimeli	Kenya	22:18
2nd place, silver medalist(s)	Habte Negash	Ethiopia	22:37
3rd place, bronze medalist(s)	Wolde Silasse Melkessa	Ethiopia	22:37
4	Rafera Workench	Ethiopia	22:45
5	Ngotho Musyoki	Kenya	22:48
6	Lawrence Gatogo	Kenya	23:04
7	Tilahun Ebba	Ethiopia	23:07
8	Debebe Demisse	Ethiopia	23:11
9	José Manuel García	Spain	23:15
10	Brahim Boutayeb	Morocco	23:19
11	Paolo Tagliapietra	Italy	23:22
12	Jeff Cannada	United States	23:23
13	John Halvorsen	Norway	23:24
14	Samuel Okemwa	Kenya	23:26
15	Chuck Trujillo	United States	23:27
16	Alejandro Gómez	Spain	23:30
17	Antonio Pérez	Spain	23:34
18	Kalcha Abcha	Ethiopia	23:35
19	Mariano Salvatore	Italy	23:36
20	Leszek Bebło	Poland	23:36
21	Paul Taylor	England	23:37
22	Antonio Peula	Spain	23:39
23	Matt Giusto	United States	23:41
24	Lahcen Tabessart	Morocco	23:44
25	Guy-Marie Manceau	France	23:49
26	Andrew Hollens	England	23:50
27	Marc Pujol	Spain	23:50
28	Fernando Figueiredo	Portugal	23:50
29	Dale Rixon	Wales	23:52
30	Brahim Ayachi	Tunisia	23:52
31	Severino Bernardini	Italy	23:53
32	Akdogan Zekeriya	Turkey	23:55
33	Jean-Pierre Lautredoux	France	23:56
34	Karl Palmer	England	23:58
35	José Gruneiro	Spain	23:58
36	John Castellano	Canada	23:58
37	Bernd Bürger	West Germany	23:59
38	Steinar Opheim	Norway	24:00
39	Sándor Serfözö	Hungary	24:01
40	Roland Pauwels	Belgium	24:02
41	James Starling	England	24:04
42	Axel Hardy	West Germany	24:04
43	Gerdy Roose	Belgium	24:05
44	Gyula Sárközi	Hungary	24:06
45	Simon Gutierrez	United States	24:06
46	Colin Dalton	Australia	24:07
47	Tom Hanlon	Scotland	24:10
48	Hank Lee	United States	24:11
49	Greg Andersen	Canada	24:13
50	Matthew Smith	Scotland	24:14
51	Hamed Hamdouni	Tunisia	24:15
52	Daniel Hacksteiner	Switzerland	24:16
53	Róbert Banai	Hungary	24:16
54	Neil Horsfield	Wales	24:19
55	Ray Boyd	Australia	24:20
56	Nick O'Brien	Ireland	24:21
57	Mika Maaskola	Finland	24:21
58	Eyob Muller	Netherlands	24:22
59	Ali Mechi	Tunisia	24:23
60	Alastair Russell	Scotland	24:24
61	Sándor Barcza	Hungary	24:25
62	Stuart Mee	Australia	24:25
63	Kym Anderson	Australia	24:28
64	Richard Findlow	England	24:29
65	Christophe Miellet	France	24:30
66	Giuseppe Bentavegna	Italy	24:31
67	John Robinson	Wales	24:32
68	Mark Sewell	Australia	24:33
69	Tom O'Gara	Ireland	24:35
70	Zoltán Káldy	Hungary	24:36
71	Seamus McCann	Northern Ireland	24:39
72	Bouazza Noualla	Algeria	24:40
73	Carl Worthington	Wales	24:41
74	Joe Falcon	United States	24:42
75	Noui Hadj Nedjai	Algeria	24:43
76	Ali Anizi	Tunisia	24:43
77	Azzedine Brahmi	Algeria	24:44
78	Carlos Reis	Portugal	24:45
79	Mohamed Benkara	Algeria	24:45
80	Karsten Müller	West Germany	24:45
81	Nicholas Hopkins	England	24:46
82	David Clarke	Canada	24:47
83	Dieter Ranftl	West Germany	24:47
84	Mads Jacobsen	Denmark	24:48
85	Amedeo Battistella	Italy	24:50
86	Joubran Ayed Al-Qahtani	Saudi Arabia	24:51
87	Pat Morris	Scotland	24:53
88	Hamaid Al-Dosari	Saudi Arabia	24:55
89	Garfield Westgate	Canada	24:57
90	Anthony Spellman	Ireland	25:00
91	Joaquim Figueiredo	Portugal	25:01
92	Gary Grant	Wales	25:02
93	Jean-Daniel Giroux	France	25:04
94	João Lopes	Portugal	25:06
95	Helmut Stuven	Denmark	25:11
96	Jan Verstraeten	Belgium	25:13
97	Jacek Szczygiel	Poland	25:14
98	Tore Bergsåker	Norway	25:16
99	Fabrice Jonneau	France	25:17
100	Erik Jylling	Denmark	25:18
101	Ruddy Walem	Belgium	25:20
102	Lotfi Rahali	Tunisia	25:21
103	Magnus Bengtsson	Sweden	25:27
104	Stephen Connell	Canada	25:30
105	Awad Saleh Ahmed	North Yemen	25:32
106	Omar Al-Safra	Saudi Arabia	25:35
107	Steve Begen	Scotland	25:36
108	Jamal Mahmoud Hamada	Palestine	25:38
109	Stanislaw Zawol	Poland	25:39
110	Jaroslaw Skorczewski	Poland	25:42
111	Farid Boukais	Algeria	25:44
112	Eli Tamar	Israel	25:45
113	Anthony Ford	Australia	25:46
114	Lars Krogsgaard	Denmark	25:47
115	Dominique Besnard	France	25:48
116	Brian Scally	Scotland	25:56
117	James O'Sullivan	Ireland	26:01
118	Gerry Conway	Northern Ireland	26:05
119	Brian Donohoe	Ireland	26:07
120	Paul Challens	Canada	26:10
121	Alun Phillips	Wales	26:13
122	Declan Caddell	Northern Ireland	26:21
123	Lars Bang Nielsen	Denmark	26:25
124	Leszek Stoklosa	Poland	26:28
125	Philip Tweedie	Northern Ireland	26:33
126	Mohamed Al-Shahrani	Saudi Arabia	26:41
127	Manahy Falah Al-Azhni	Kuwait	26:56
128	Tibor Baier	Hungary	27:01
129	Michael Hunter	Northern Ireland	27:04
130	Saleh Mubarak Al-Beyya	Saudi Arabia	27:05
131	Gardar Sigurdsson	Iceland	27:15
132	Michael Wray	Northern Ireland	27:30
133	Faisal Al-Etebi	Kuwait	27:35
134	Patrik Wallin	Sweden	27:41
135	Khalid Aziz	Kuwait	27:45
136	Jacek Nitka	Poland	27:52
137	Michael Neish	Gibraltar	28:17
138	Steinn Jóhannsson	Iceland	29:09
139	Mark Sanchez	Gibraltar	29:09
—	Antonio Resende	Portugal	DNF
—	Rui Viegas	Portugal	DNF

==== Teams ====
Rank	Team	Points
1st place, gold medalist(s)	Ethiopia: Habte Negash / 2; Wolde Silasse Melkessa / 3; Rafera Workench / 4; Tilahun Ebba / 7; (Debebe Demisse) / (8); (Kalcha Abcha) / (18)	16
2nd place, silver medalist(s)	Kenya: Kipkemboi Kimeli / 1; Ngotho Musyoki / 5; Lawrence Gatogo / 6; Samuel Okemwa / 14	26
3rd place, bronze medalist(s)	Spain: José Manuel García / 9; Alejandro Gómez / 16; Antonio Pérez / 17; Antonio Peula / 22; (Marc Pujol) / (27); (José Gruneiro) / (35)	64
4	United States: Jeff Cannada / 12; Chuck Trujillo / 15; Matt Giusto / 23; Simon Gutierrez / 45; (Hank Lee) / (48); (Joe Falcon) / (74)	95
5	England: Paul Taylor / 21; Andrew Hollens / 26; Karl Palmer / 34; James Starling / 41; (Richard Findlow) / (64); (Nicholas Hopkins) / (81)	122
6	Italy: Paolo Tagliapietra / 11; Mariano Salvatore / 19; Severino Bernardini / 31; Giuseppe Bentavegna / 66; (Amedeo Battistella) / (85)	127
7	Hungary: Sándor Serfözö / 39; Gyula Sárközi / 44; Róbert Banai / 53; Sándor Barcza / 61; (Zoltán Káldy) / (70); (Tibor Baier) / (128)	197
8	Tunisia: Brahim Ayachi / 30; Hamed Hamdouni / 51; Ali Mechi / 59; Ali Anizi / 76; (Lotfi Rahali) / (102)	216
9	France: Guy-Marie Manceau / 25; Jean-Pierre Lautredoux / 33; Christophe Miellet / 65; Jean-Daniel Giroux / 93; (Fabrice Jonneau) / (99); (Dominique Besnard) / (115)	216
10	Wales: Dale Rixon / 29; Neil Horsfield / 54; John Robinson / 67; Carl Worthington / 73; (Gary Grant) / (92); (Alun Phillips) / (121)	223
11	Australia: Colin Dalton / 46; Ray Boyd / 55; Stuart Mee / 62; Kym Anderson / 63; (Mark Sewell) / (68); (Anthony Ford) / (113)	226
12	West Germany: Bernd Bürger / 37; Axel Hardy / 42; Karsten Müller / 80; Dieter Ranftl / 83	242
13	Scotland: Tom Hanlon / 47; Matthew Smith / 50; Alastair Russell / 60; Pat Morris / 87; (Steve Begen) / (107); (Brian Scally) / (116)	244
14	Canada: John Castellano / 36; Greg Andersen / 49; David Clark / 82; Garfield Westgate / 89; (Stephen Connell) / (104); (Paul Challens) / (120)	256
15	Belgium: Roland Pauwels / 40; Gerdy Roose / 43; Jan Verstraeten / 96; Ruddy Walem / 101	280
16	Portugal: Fernando Figueiredo / 28; Carlos Reis / 78; Joaquim Figueiredo / 91; João Lopes / 94; (Antonio Resende) / (DNF); (Rui Viegas) / (DNF)	291
17	Algeria: Bouazza Noualla / 72; Noui Hadj Nedjai / 75; Azzedine Brahmi / 77; Mohamed Benkara / 79; (Farid Boukais) / (111)	303
18	Ireland: Nick O'Brien / 56; Tom O'Gara / 69; Anthony Spellman / 90; James O'Sullivan / 117; (Brian Donohoe) / (119)	332
19	Poland: Leszek Bebło / 20; Jacek Szczygiel / 97; Stanislaw Zawol / 109; Jaroslaw Skorczewski / 110; (Leszek Stoklosa) / (124); (Jacek Nitka) / (136)	336
20	Denmark: Mads Jacobsen / 84; Helmut Stuven / 95; Erik Jylling / 100; Lars Krogsgaard / 114; (Lars Bang Nielsen) / (123)	393
21	Saudi Arabia: Joubran Ayed Al-Qahtani / 86; Hamaid Al-Dosari / 88; Omar Al-Safra / 106; Mohamed Al-Shahrani / 126; (Saleh Mubarak Al-Beyya) / (130)	406
22	Northern Ireland: Seamus McCann / 71; Gerry Conway / 118; Declan Caddell / 122; Philip Tweedie / 125; (Michael Hunter) / (129); (Michael Wray) / (132)	436

- Note: Athletes in parentheses did not score for the team result

== Participation ==
An unofficial count yields the participation of 141 athletes from 35 countries in the Junior men's race, two athletes less than the official number published.

- Algeria (5)
- Australia (6)
- Belgium (4)
- Canada (6)
- Denmark (5)
- England (6)
- Ethiopia (6)
- Finland (1)
- France (6)
- Gibraltar (2)
- Hungary (6)
- Iceland (2)
- Ireland (5)
- Israel (1)
- Italy (5)
- Kenya (4)
- Kuwait (3)
- Morocco (2)
- Netherlands (1)
- Northern Ireland (6)
- North Yemen (1)
- Norway (3)
- Palestine (1)
- Poland (6)
- Portugal (6)
- Saudi Arabia (5)
- Scotland (6)
- Spain (6)
- Sweden (2)
- Switzerland (1)
- Tunisia (5)
- Turkey (1)
- United States (6)
- Wales (6)
- West Germany (4)

== See also ==
- 1985 IAAF World Cross Country Championships – Senior men's race
- 1985 IAAF World Cross Country Championships – Senior women's race
