= 1993 World Championships in Athletics – Men's 10,000 metres =

The men's 10,000 metres event featured at the 1993 World Championships in Stuttgart, Germany. There were a total number of 36 participating athletes, with two qualifying heats and the final being held on 22 August 1993.

Defending champion Moses Tanui moved out to the front early, controlling the pace. His progress was marked by World Junior Champion Haile Gebrselassie. The field strung out behind them, one by one dropping off the back. With nine laps to go, the last to drop off was Richard Chelimo, then it was just the two. Tanui was unable to shake the youngster. Coming into the bell, Gebrselassie moved closer to Tanui and accidentally stepping on his heel. Tanui's shoe flew off. With just one shoe, an angered Tanui sprinted out to a quick 5-meter lead, expanding to a 10-meter lead with 200 to go. Through the final turn, Gebrselassie began to gain. As they onto the final straight, Tanui went wide, straining to sprint to the finish. Gebrselassie accepted the opening, sprinting past Tanui on the inside and on to a 5-meter victory.

This was the changing of the guard as Gebrselassie would go on to win the next three world championships and two Olympics.

== Final ==
RANK	FINAL	TIME
	Haile Gebrselassie (ETH)	27:46.02
	Moses Tanui (KEN)	27:46.54
	Richard Chelimo (KEN)	28:06.02
4.	Stéphane Franke (GER)	28:10.69
5.	Aloÿs Nizigama (BDI)	28:13.43
6.	Francesco Panetta (ITA)	28:27.05
7.	Todd Williams (USA)	28:30.49
8.	Antonio Silio (ARG)	28:36.88
9.	Germán Silva (MEX)	28:39.47
10.	William Sigei (KEN)	28:54.39
11.	Antonio Serrano (ESP)	29:04.10
12.	Salvatore Antibo (ITA)	29:10.83
13.	Boay Akonay (TAN)	29:15.13
14.	Armando Quintanilla (MEX)	29:32.34
15.	Tadashi Fukushima (JPN)	29:46.70
16.	José Carlos Adán (ESP)	30:04.34
17.	Dan Nelson (USA)	30:41.72
—	Rolando Vera (ECU)	DNF
—	Fita Bayisa (ETH)	DNF
—	Oleg Strizhakov (RUS)	DNF

== Qualifying heats ==
- Held on Friday 1993-08-20

RANK	HEAT 1	TIME
1.	Antonio Silio (ARG)	28:16.62
2.	Haile Gebrselassie (ETH)	28:17.95
3.	Moses Tanui (KEN)	28:18.56
4.	Richard Chelimo (KEN)	28:18.70
5.	Boay Akonay (TAN)	28:18.97
6.	Stéphane Franke (GER)	28:19.11
7.	Francesco Panetta (ITA)	28:20.49
8.	Germán Silva (MEX)	28:22.16
9.	José Carlos Adán (ESP)	28:23.08
10.	Steve Plasencia (USA)	28:40.69
11.	Fackson Nkandu (ZAM)	29:03.67
12.	Steve Moneghetti (AUS)	29:21.18
13.	Domingos Castro (POR)	29:35.47
14.	Nozomi Saho (JPN)	29:36.40
15.	John Mwathiwa (MAW)	29:45.55
	Zoltán Káldy (HUN)	DNF
	José Regalo (POR)	DNF
	Ahmed Mohamed Moosa (PLE)	DNF

RANK	HEAT 2	TIME
1.	Salvatore Antibo (ITA)	28:27.48
2.	Fita Bayisa (ETH)	28:28.32
3.	William Sigei (KEN)	28:28.33
4.	Todd Williams (USA)	28:28.62
5.	Dan Nelson (USA)	28:28.76
6.	Aloÿs Nizigama (BDI)	28:29.18
7.	Tadashi Fukushima (JPN)	28:29.49
8.	Oleg Strizhakov (RUS)	28:29.84
9.	Antonio Serrano (ESP)	28:31.48
10.	Armando Quintanilla (MEX)	28:34.57
11.	Rolando Vera (ECU)	28:35.45
12.	Martin Pitayo (MEX)	28:54.23
13.	Tendai Chimusasa (ZIM)	28:57.68
14.	Luis Jesus (POR)	29:12.00
15.	Jun Hiratsuka (JPN)	29:12.22
16.	Murusamy Ramachandran (MAS)	29:38.97
17.	Thein Win Gopal (MYA)	29:56.61
	Mathias Ntawulikura (RWA)	DNS

== See also ==
- 1991 Men's World Championships 10.000 metres
- 1992 Men's Olympic 10.000 metres
- 1995 Men's World Championships 10.000 metres
