= 1983 IAAF World Cross Country Championships – Junior men's race =

Junior men's race at the 1983 IAAF World Cross Country Championships
- Organisers: IAAF
- Edition: 11th
- Date: March 20
- Host city: Gateshead, Tyne and Wear, England
- Venue: Riverside Park
- Events: 1
- Distances: 8.033 km – Junior men
- Participation: 107 athletes from 25 nations

The Junior men's race at the 1983 IAAF World Cross Country Championships was held in Gateshead, England, at the Riverside Park on March 20, 1983. A report on the event was given in the Glasgow Herald and in the Evening Times.

Complete results, medallists, and the results of British athletes were published.

== Race results ==
=== Junior men's race (8.033 km) ===
==== Individual ====
Rank	Athlete	Country	Time
1st place, gold medalist(s)	Fesseha Abebe	Ethiopia	24:58
2nd place, silver medalist(s)	Angaso Telega	Ethiopia	24:59
3rd place, bronze medalist(s)	Jonathan Richards	England	25:07
4	Gonfa Negere	Ethiopia	25:22
5	José Manuel Albentosa	Spain	25:35
6	Teka Mekonnen	Ethiopia	25:40
7	Cyrille Laventure	France	25:51
8	Marc Olesen	Canada	25:53
9	Asfaw Tadesse	Ethiopia	25:57
10	Richard Carter	England	26:06
11	José Manuel García	Spain	26:10
12	Antonio Pérez	Spain	26:15
13	José Zabaleta	Spain	26:16
14	Mohamed Salah Rajhi	Tunisia	26:17
15	Joseba Sarriegui	Spain	26:19
16	Disso Dissessa	Ethiopia	26:23
17	Alfredo Munoz	Spain	26:26
18	Paul McCaffrey	Northern Ireland	26:29
19	Luis Miguel	Portugal	26:30
20	Clifton Bradeley	England	26:31
21	Nikolay Matyushenko	Soviet Union	26:31
22	Corrado Di Salvatore	Italy	26:32
23	Mustapha El Nechchadi	Morocco	26:33
24	Robert Rice	Canada	26:35
25	Phil Makepeace	England	26:39
26	Luis Soares	Portugal	26:40
27	Joseph Leuchtmann	United States	26:41
28	Gerry Wallace	Ireland	26:46
29	Arnold van Heesvelde	Belgium	26:46
30	Thierry Pantel	France	26:46
31	Paulo Pinhal	Portugal	26:48
32	Abdelkader Belhaied	Tunisia	26:48
33	David Dunne	Ireland	26:53
34	Giuseppe D'Urso	Italy	26:54
35	Bob Mau	United States	26:56
36	Laroussi Mechi	Tunisia	26:57
37	John Castellano	Canada	26:58
38	Glenn Charanduk	Canada	27:00
39	Paul Taylor	England	27:02
40	Andrew Rodgers	Wales	27:04
41	Steve Diech	United States	27:06
42	Paul Gompers	United States	27:07
43	Walter Bassi	Italy	27:08
44	Miloud Djellal	Algeria	27:12
45	Igor Lotoryev	Soviet Union	27:12
46	Stefan Hendrickx	Belgium	27:12
47	Paul Stogryn	United States	27:12
48	Robert Cameron	Scotland	27:12
49	Sergey Smirnov	Soviet Union	27:14
50	Kai Jenkel	Switzerland	27:15
51	Khaled Aouita	Morocco	27:16
52	Abdellah Boubia	Morocco	27:17
53	Markus Hacksteiner	Switzerland	27:19
54	Patric Nilsson	Sweden	27:20
55	Martin Vile	England	27:20
56	Aleksandr Burtsev	Soviet Union	27:20
57	Ezzedine Amdouni	Tunisia	27:26
58	Leonard O'Regan	Ireland	27:26
59	Alexandr Sokoholovskiy	Soviet Union	27:26
60	Yehezkel Halifa	Israel	27:26
61	Mark Cutts	Canada	27:26
62	Brian Matthews	Wales	27:26
63	Marc Nelis	Belgium	27:27
64	Peter Conaghan	Scotland	27:27
65	Adam Sarty	Canada	27:28
66	Romdhane Belkhaied	Tunisia	27:29
67	Sergio Bruni	Italy	27:29
68	William Brist	United States	27:30
69	William Lacy	Ireland	27:31
70	Didier Verhaege	France	27:31
71	Ian Williams	Wales	27:32
72	Marcel Versteeg	Netherlands	27:37
73	Angelo Brunetti	Italy	27:40
74	Nigel Gooch	Wales	27:40
75	Luis Serrano	Portugal	27:40
76	Ahmed Lili	Morocco	27:40
77	John McNeil	Scotland	27:41
78	Alan Puckrin	Scotland	27:49
79	Mohamed Moulhine	Morocco	27:50
80	Benny Pollentier	Belgium	27:55
81	Abdelhak Henane	Algeria	27:57
82	Patrick Lingard	France	27:58
83	Johan van Delanotte	Belgium	28:01
84	Pierre Richard	Belgium	28:02
85	Gordan Lang	Northern Ireland	28:04
86	Nazar Habib	Wales	28:06
87	Pat O'Neill	Northern Ireland	28:11
88	Christian Vagner	France	28:14
89	Michael Taggart	Scotland	28:16
90	Cormac O'Riordan	Ireland	28:19
91	Carsten Borgen	Denmark	28:21
92	Pascal Tristant	France	28:26
93	Ali Günes	Turkey	28:29
94	Alwyn Ormond	Wales	28:37
95	Pat McKillop	Northern Ireland	28:42
96	Alan Wilson	Scotland	28:45
97	Mohamed Ahmad	Palestine	28:48
98	Jesper Mathiesen	Denmark	28:54
99	Philip Tweedie	Northern Ireland	28:59
100	Jim Hefferon	Northern Ireland	29:13
101	Mohamed Essahal	Morocco	29:15
102	Abdullah Saud	Kuwait	29:51
103	Khrlio Mourdi	Kuwait	31:19
104	M.Ibrahim Haji	Kuwait	31:22
105	Talal Al-Asfir	Kuwait	31:56
—	José Macedo	Portugal	DNF
—	Fernando Ferreira	Portugal	DNF

==== Teams ====
Rank	Team	Points
1st place, gold medalist(s)	Ethiopia: Fesseha Abebe / 1; Angaso Telega / 2; Gonfa Negere / 4; Teka Mekonnen / 6; (Asfaw Tadesse) / (9); (Disso Dissessa) / (16)	13
2nd place, silver medalist(s)	Spain: José Manuel Albentosa / 5; José Manuel García / 11; Antonio Pérez / 12; José Zabaleta / 13; (Joseba Sarriegui) / (15); (Alfredo Munoz) / (17)	41
3rd place, bronze medalist(s)	England: Jonathan Richards / 3; Richard Carter / 10; Clifton Bradeley / 20; Phil Makepeace / 25; (Paul Taylor) / (39); (Martin Vile) / (55)	58
4	Canada: Marc Olesen / 8; Robert Rice / 24; John Castellano / 37; Glenn Charanduk / 38; (Mark Cutts) / (61); (Adam Sarty) / (65)	107
5	Tunisia: Mohamed Salah Rajhi / 14; Abdelkader Belhaied / 32; Laroussi Mechi / 36; Ezzedine Amdouni / 57; (Romdhane Belkhaied) / (66)	139
6	United States: Joseph Leuchtmann / 27; Bob Mau / 35; Steve Diech / 41; Paul Gompers / 42; (Paul Stogryn) / (47); (William Brist) / (68)	145
7	Portugal: Luis Miguel / 19; Luis Soares / 26; Paulo Pinhal / 31; Luis Serrano / 75; (José Macedo) / (DNF); (Fernando Ferreira) / (DNF)	151
8	Italy: Corrado Di Salvatore / 22; Giuseppe D'Urso / 34; Walter Bassi / 43; Sergio Bruni / 67; (Angelo Brunetti) / (73)	166
9	Soviet Union: Nikolay Matyushenko / 21; Igor Lotoryev / 45; Sergey Smirnov / 49; Aleksandr Burtsev / 56; (Alexandr Sokoholovskiy) / (59)	171
10	Ireland: Gerry Wallace / 28; David Dunne / 33; Leonard O'Regan / 58; William Lacy / 69; (Cormac O'Riordan) / (90)	188
11	France: Cyrille Laventure / 7; Thierry Pantel / 30; Didier Verhaege / 70; Patrick Lingard / 82; (Christian Vagner) / (88); (Pascal Tristant) / (92)	189
12	Morocco: Mustapha El Nechchadi / 23; Khaled Aouita / 51; Abdellah Boubia / 52; Ahmed Lili / 76; (Mohamed Moulhine) / (79); (Mohamed Essahal) / (101)	202
13	Belgium: Arnold van Heesvelde / 29; Stefan Hendrickx / 46; Marc Nelis / 63; Benny Pollentier / 80; (Johan van Delanotte) / (83); (Pierre Richard) / (84)	218
14	Wales: Andrew Rodgers / 40; Brian Matthews / 62; Ian Williams / 71; Nigel Gooch / 74; (Nazar Habib) / (86); (Alwyn Ormond) / (94)	247
15	Scotland: Robert Cameron / 48; Peter Conaghan / 64; John McNeil / 77; Alan Puckrin / 78; (Michael Taggart) / (89); (Alan Wilson) / (96)	267
16	Northern Ireland: Paul McCaffrey / 18; Gordan Lang / 85; Pat O'Neill / 87; Pat McKillop / 95; (Philip Tweedie) / (99); (Jim Hefferon) / (100)	285
17	Kuwait: Abdullah Saud / 102; Khrlio Mourdi / 103; M.Ibrahim Haji / 104; Talal Al-Asfir / 105	414

- Note: Athletes in parentheses did not score for the team result

== Participation ==
An unofficial count yields the participation of 107 athletes from 25 countries in the Junior men's race. This is in agreement with the official numbers as published.

- Algeria (2)
- Belgium (6)
- Canada (6)
- Denmark (2)
- England (6)
- Ethiopia (6)
- France (6)
- Ireland (5)
- Israel (1)
- Italy (5)
- Kuwait (4)
- Morocco (6)
- Netherlands (1)
- Northern Ireland (6)
- Palestine (1)
- Portugal (6)
- Scotland (6)
- Soviet Union (5)
- Spain (6)
- Sweden (1)
- Switzerland (2)
- Tunisia (5)
- Turkey (1)
- United States (6)
- Wales (6)

== See also ==
- 1983 IAAF World Cross Country Championships – Senior men's race
- 1983 IAAF World Cross Country Championships – Senior women's race
