= Tadashi Fukushima =

Tadashi Fukushima may refer to:

- Tadashi Fukushima (runner)
- Tadashi Fukushima (equestrian)
