= Germán Silva =

Mexican long-distance runner

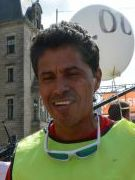
- Silva in 2015

Personal information
- Born: 9 January 1968 (age 58) Zacatlán, Puebla, Mexico

Sport
- Sport: Track and field
Medal record
Representing Mexico
World Half Marathon Championships
Silver medal – second place	1994 Oslo	Half marathon
CAC Games
Gold medal – first place	1990 Mexico City	3000m steeplechase

Germán Silva Martínez (born 9 January 1968) is a Mexican former long-distance runner who specialized in the marathon. His foremost achievements were back-to-back victories at the New York City Marathon in 1994 and 1995. He represented Mexico twice at the Summer Olympics, in 1992 and 1996. He also competed at the World Championships in Athletics on two occasions. His personal best for the marathon is two hours, eight minutes, and 56 seconds.

Outside marathon running, he was the silver medallist at the 1994 IAAF World Half Marathon Championships (where he set the Mexican record of 1:00:28) and won a gold medal in the steeplechase at the 1990 Central American and Caribbean Games.

== Career ==
Silva grew up in El Tecomate (municipality of Chicontepec de Tejeda, Veracruz). He began his career as a steeplechase specialist and won his first medals in that event, taking bronze at the 1988 Ibero-American Championships and then winning his first international title at the 1990 Central American and Caribbean Games in Mexico City. That same year he began to compete in road running events and won the Lilac Bloomsday Run. In his final international steeplechase outing, he came sixth at the 1991 Pan American Games.

Silva changed his focus to the 10,000 metres for the 1992 Barcelona Olympics and the switch paid off as he ran a career best time of 27:46.52 in June then finished in sixth place in the Olympic final. He represented Mexico in that event at the 1993 World Championships in Athletics and came ninth overall. He returned for a second attempt at the 1995 World Championships in Athletics and despite having one of his fastest-ever runs in the heats (27:49.07), he eventually finished in 13th place.

He came in third at the 1994 London Marathon, then finished as runner-up behind Khalid Skah at the 1994 IAAF World Half Marathon Championships in Oslo, taking the silver medal. Although he was one second away from victory at the Oslo race, his half marathon time of 1:00:28 was a Mexican record – a mark which, as of 2012, remains the country's best. During the New York City Marathon race in November, he recovered from a wrong turn seven-tenths of a mile before the finish that put him 40 yards behind his countryman Benjamín Paredes. He ran a 5:15 final mile, including the detour, to beat Paredes by two seconds with a time of 2:11:21. The incident earned him the nickname "Wrong-Way Silva".

At the start of 1995 he ran at the Tokyo Half Marathon and recorded his second-fastest ever time, coming second to Brazil's Eduardo do Nascimento in 1:00:47. At the 1995 World Championships in Athletics, he placed thirteenth in the 10,000 metres. A few months later, he won the New York City Marathon for a second time running, finishing in a time of 2:11:00. He made his Olympic marathon debut at the 1996 Atlanta Games and finished in sixth place. In 1997 he was fifth in New York and fourth in the Boston Marathon. The year after, he ran a lifetime marathon best of 2:08:56 at the Boston race, but this was only enough for sixth place.

Outside major events, he competed on the European road running circuit and had victories at the Giro di Castelbuono and Amatrice-Configno race in Italy in 1995. He also won the 1998 Egmond Half Marathon, which he won in a course-record time of 1:03:08.

Following his failure to finish at the 2001 IAAF World Half Marathon Championships, Silva retired from professional running. He owns a successful company, Germán Silva Coaching, organizes races, and is the ambassador of the Texel Half Marathon in the Netherlands. He also continues to enjoy his daily runs, coaching all levels of runners, including Mexico's best marathoner Madai Perez (2:22:59) and 2010 Central American Games gold medallist in the 10,000 metres Juan Carlos Romero. Silva started participating in triathlons and Ironman events (Cozumel 2009 10:40:44). He participated in the Half Ironman of Buffalo Springs 2011 (4:53:53). He's also head coach athletics at La Loma, a high-altitude training center in San Luis Potosí and a successful businessman in Wellness International Network.

Silva was given the Abebe Bikila Award for 2011 by New York Road Runners in recognition of his memorable victories at the New York City Marathon and his continued work in promoting running in the Mexican community. In October 2014, NYRR received from King Felipe of Spain the prestigious Prince of Asturias Award. Germán, together with Tegla Loroupe as outstanding examples representing the running community, received the same honour. Two weeks later, he was inducted to the NYRR Hall of Fame together with Kathrine Switzer, George Spitz, and Alan Steinfeld.

== Achievements ==
Year	Competition	Venue	Position	Event	Notes
1988	Ibero-American Championships	Mexico City, Mexico	3rd	3000 m s'chase	9:14.45 A
1990	Central American and Caribbean Games	Mexico City, Mexico	1st	3000 m s'chase	9:01.26 A
1991	Pan American Games	Havana, Cuba	6th	3000 m s'chase	8:51.16
1992	Olympic Games	Barcelona, Spain	6th	10,000 m	28:20.19
1993	World Championships	Stuttgart, Germany	9th	10,000 m	28:39.47
1994	World Half Marathon Championships	Oslo, Norway	2nd	Half marathon	1:00:28 PB
1994	New York City Marathon	New York City, United States	1st	Marathon	2:11:21
1994	London Marathon	London, United Kingdom	3rd	Marathon	2:09:18
1995	World Championships	Gothenburg, Sweden	13th	10,000 m	27:55.34
1995	New York City Marathon	New York City, United States	1st	Marathon	2:11:00
1996	London Marathon	London, United Kingdom	11th	Marathon	2:14:49
1996	Olympic Games	Atlanta, United States	6th	Marathon	2:14:29
1997	New York City Marathon	New York City, United States	5th	Marathon	2:10:19
1997	Boston Marathon	Boston, United States	4th	Marathon	2:11:21
1998	Boston Marathon	Boston, United States	6th	Marathon	2:08:56
1998	New York City Marathon	New York City, United States	4th	Marathon	2:10:24

=== Personal bests ===
- 3000 metres steeplechase – 8:33.52 minutes (1989)
- 5000 metres – 13:26.11 (1993)
- 10,000 metres – 27:46.52 (1992)
- Half marathon – 1:00:28 (1994)
- Marathon – 2:08:56 (1998)
