= Carsten Eich =

German runner

Carsten Eich (born 9 January 1970) is a retired (East) German runner who specialized in the 10,000 metres and the marathons. He is an eight-time German champion and national record holder in the half marathon.

== Running career ==
He was born in Leipzig and represented the clubs SC DHfK Leipzig, SG Motor Gohlis-Nord Leipzig, LAC Quelle Fürth and LG Braunschweig.

On the track he won the 5000 metres at the 1989 European Junior Championships, finished 22nd in the 10,000 metres at the 1990 European Championships, competed in 10,000 metres at the 1992 Olympic Games without reaching the final and finished 16th in the 10,000 metres at the 1997 World Championships.

He was also a marathon specialist, finishing 35th at the 1994 European Championships and 54th at the 2000 Olympic Games. He also finished 15th as the best European at the 1994 World Half Marathon Championships and 60th at the 1996 World Half Marathon Championships.

On the national level, Eich became the last East German champion in the 5000 metres, in 1990, ahead of Jens Karrass and reigning champion Stephan Freigang. He also won the 10,000 metres ahead of Stephan Freigang and Steffen Dittmann.

Eich became German 10,000 metres champion in 1992, and had several silver and bronze medals in 5000 and 10,000 metres. He finally became marathon champion in 1999 and half marathon champion in 1997, 1999, 2000, 2001, 2002, 2003, 2004 and 2006.

His personal best track times were 7:46.51 minutes in the 3000 metres, 13:27.90 minutes in the 5000 metres and 27:41.94 minutes in the 10,000 metres. He ran the half marathon in 1:00:34 hours, achieved in April 1993 in Berlin, and the marathon in 2:10:22 hours, achieved at the 1999 Hamburg Marathon. Eich holds the German record in the half marathon; also in 10 kilometres road running with 27:47 minutes, achieved in April 1993 in Paderborn.

== Post-active career ==
Eich retired in 2007. Educated as a pharmacist, he later worked in sports and health management, from 2012 as coach of Sabrina Mockenhaupt.
