= Richard Chelimo =

Kenyan long-distance runner

Medal record

Men's athletics

Representing Kenya

Olympic Games
Silver medal – second place	1992 Barcelona	10,000 m

World Championships
Silver medal – second place	1991 Tokyo	10,000 m
Bronze medal – third place	1993 Stuttgart	10,000 m

World Junior Championships
Gold medal – first place	1990 Plovdiv	10,000 m

Richard Chelimo (21 April 1972 – 15 August 2001) was a Kenyan long-distance runner, and a world record holder over 10,000 metres. However, he is best known as the silver medallist in the controversial 10,000m at the 1992 Olympics in Barcelona. He was also a world junior record holder in the 10,000m.

== Family and tribe ==
Chelimo, who was born in the Marakwet region of Kenya, was a member of the Kalenjin tribe (known by some as the "running tribe"). He came from a noted athletic family, even amongst the tribesmen, his cousin, Moses Kiptanui, was a three-time steeplechase World champion, whilst his brother, Ismael Kirui, was twice World champion over 5000 m. Richard Chelimo was married to Monica Chelimo and were blessed with 5 children.

== Athletics career ==
Chelimo's first international success was in the junior section of the 1990 world cross country championship in Aix-les-Bains, France, where he took silver. Though Chelimo received little attention due to the Kenyan domination of the event, their team won 10 successive junior titles.

However, it was not long before the athletic community took notice of Chelimo's talent. Later that year he won the gold medal in the 10,000 m at the world junior championships in Plovdiv, Bulgaria. Chelimo won the race by 12 seconds from his own brother, Kirui, who was only 15 at the time.

Chelimo was selected in the Kenyan senior squad for the 10,000 m at the 1991 world championships, which took place in Tokyo. As Kenya's second runner he was assigned the task of being pacemaker to Moses Tanui. He was successful in dragging Tanui clear of his main rival, Morocco's Khalid Skah, and on the final lap he allowed Tanui to sprint clear to take the gold medal.

The following year, at the Olympics, Chelimo met Skah again. With three laps remaining in the 10,000 m final the two athletes were clear and battling for the gold medal. At this point the pair came to lap another Moroccan athlete, Hammou Boutayeb, who stayed with the leaders even after being lapped. The rules state that a lapped runner cannot "assist" another runner but, although Boutayeb's actions were interpreted as unsportsmanlike by the crowd, it was not certain that there was any collusion, that Skah gained any advantage or that Chelimo was disadvantaged. Regardless, these events incensed the Spanish crowd, and the Swedish track judge Carl-Gustav Tollemar attempted to interfere with Boutayeb's run.

During the final 150 m Skah sprinted away from Chelimo to win the race, and was temporarily disqualified, making Chelimo the temporary Olympic champion. However, the Moroccans appealed against the disqualification and Skah was reinstated the next morning because the rule under which he was disqualified did not define a penalty.

In 1993 Chelimo broke the world junior and senior 10,000 m world record, in a time of 27:07.91 minutes, in Stockholm. He was to hold the senior world record for only five days before it was broken again by his compatriot Yobes Ondieki. He held the junior record for over 11 years before it was broken by Uganda Boniface Kiprop Toroitich at a Golden League meeting on 3 September 2004, in a time of 27 min 04.00 s.

At the 1993 world championships in Stuttgart, Germany, Chelimo once again failed to win gold at a major championships. He managed only third place as he could not match the pace of Tanui and, a new star from Ethiopia, Haile Gebrselassie. This was another controversial race as Tanui lost a shoe after Gebreselassie stepped on his heel; the Ethiopian went on to win the race.

== Life after athletics ==
Chelimo retired from athletics in 1996; according to his cousin, Kiptanui, he retired after growing despondent following his failure to rise to the very top of the sport. He returned to his old job in the army and put on a lot of weight and began to drink excessively — a decline quite similar to that of Henry Rono. However, his friends Tanui and William Mutwol encouraged him to return to training and get back into shape. Chelimo eventually got back down to within 5 kg of his racing weight. He died of a brain tumour at the age of 29.

== See also ==
- List of notable brain tumor patients

Records
Preceded by Arturo Barrios	Men's 10,000 m World Record Holder; July 5, 1993 – July 10, 1993	Succeeded by Yobes Ondieki
