= Charles Naveko =

Malawian long-distance runner

Personal information
- Nationality: Malawian
- Born: 31 August 1966 (age 59)

Sport
- Sport: Long-distance running
- Event: 10,000 metres
Medal record
Men's athletics
Representing Malawi
African Zone VI Championships
| Bronze medal – third place | 1988 Gaborone | 10,000 m |

Charles Naveko (born 31 August 1966) is a Malawian long-distance runner. He won the bronze medal in the 10,000 m at the 1988 African Zone VI Athletics Championships, and competed in the men's 10,000 metres at the 1988 Summer Olympics.

At the 1988 African Zone VI Athletics Championships, Naveko won the bronze medal in the 10,000 m, setting a personal best time of 30:07.7.

That same year, Naveko qualified for the 10,000 m at the 1988 Olympics. He finished 20th in his heat with a time of 31:23.53 and did not advance to the finals.
