= Todd Williams (runner) =

American long-distance runner 2 x Olympian

Personal information
- Nationality: American
- Born: Todd Williams; March 7, 1969 (age 57) Monroe, Michigan, U.S.

Sport
- Sport: Track
- Event: 10,000 meters
- College team: University of Tennessee

Achievements and titles
- Personal best(s): 5000 meters: 13:19.50; 10,000m: 27:31.34

Todd Williams (born March 7, 1969) is a retired long-distance runner from the United States, who represented his native country at two consecutive Summer Olympics, competing in Barcelona 1992 finishing 10th in the 10k and a DNF in the semifinals in Atlanta 1996. Williams was born in Monroe, Michigan. During high school he won the Michigan cross country team race title twice (1985, 1986) as well as the class A 3200m race twice indoor and outdoor (1986, 1987) and a 1st team All-American his junior and senior years.

He was a two-time United States cross country champion, with victories in 1991 and 1993 and the 1992, 1993, 1995 and 1996 10,000m USA Champion. He won his last USA title on the track at the USA Indoor Championship in the 3000m 1997.

He attended the University of Tennessee where he was an All-American for three years, won the USA junior national cross country title(1988) and as a senior helped lead the Vols to an NCAA track and field title in 1991.

As a professional runner for adidas he made the world championships in cross country 1992, 1993 and 1995 and was No. 1 American in those races along with qualifying for two world track and field teams(1993 and 1995) finishing as top American in both those events as well. As a junior he qualified for the World Junior Cross Country Championships in 1987 (Warsaw, Poland) and 1988 (Auckland, New Zealand) where he was No. 1 American finisher in both races.

On the road racing scene Todd won USA titles in the 10k, 15k, 10 mile, 1/2 marathon distances as well as winning many other major road races.

After his professional running career ended in 2002 he started training in the martial art Brazilian jiu-jitsu and is now a 4th degree black belt under Luiz Palhares and owns Monroe Jiu Jitsu in Monroe, Michigan since 2017.

From 8th grade through his professional career, he was coached by Rick Kleinsmith, Randy Monday, Bobby Wood, David Bork, Doug Brown and George Watts.

His personal bests were 4:00 in the mile, 8:14 2 mile, 13:19.50 in the 5000 m and 27:31.34 in the 10,000 m. He ran his marathon best of 2:11:17 in the 1997 Chicago Marathon. He is a five-time winner of the Gate River Run and set the current American record over 15 km at the event, running a time of 42:22 minutes for the distance. This is also the record for the whole of the North American, Central American and Caribbean region (NACAC).

Williams also holds the 3rd-fastest half marathon time ever by an American of 60:11 which he ran in Tokyo in 1993.

He's married to Lindsey Williams and has two daughters Brooke and Bailee.

== International competitions ==
Year	Competition	Venue	Position	Event
1992	Olympic Games	Barcelona, Spain	10th	10,000 m
1993	World Championships	Stuttgart, Germany	7th	10,000 m
1995	World Championships	Gothenburg, Sweden	9th	10,000 m
1996	Olympic Games	Atlanta, Georgia	DNF	10,000 m
