= Igor Lotaryov =

Medal record

Men's athletics

Representing the Soviet Union

IAAF World Cup
Bronze medal – third place	1985 Canberra	1500 m

Igor Lotaryov (Russian: И́горь Лотарёв; born 30 August 1964) is a Russian former Soviet male middle-distance runner who competed mainly in the 1500 metres. He set his lifetime best of 3:34.49 minutes for the event in Brussels in 1985.

He made his international debut as a junior athlete, running in the Soviet teams at the IAAF World Cross Country Championships in 1982 and 1983. He won his first international medal at the 1983 European Athletics Junior Championships, finishing second in the 1500 m behind East German Maik Dreissigacker.

He enjoyed senior success in the mid-1980s including bronze medals at the Friendship Games and 1985 IAAF World Cup, then a silver medal behind compatriot Pavel Yakovlev at the 1986 Goodwill Games. He was also a 1500 m finalist at the 1986 European Athletics Championships and the 1987 European Athletics Indoor Championships.

He set the first IAAF-recognised world indoor record for the 1000 metres event, running 2:18.00 on 14 February 1987. This stood for almost five years before being beaten by Rob Druppers of the Netherlands. As of 2017, his time remains in the top 40 of all-time.

Lotaryov was a three-time national champion, taking the indoor 1500 m title twice at the Soviet Indoor Athletics Championships (1984, 1987) and once outdoors at the Soviet Athletics Championships in 1985.

== International competitions ==
Year	Competition	Venue	Position	Event	Notes
1982	World Cross Country Championships	Rome, Italy	40th	Junior race	24:18.9
1982	World Cross Country Championships	Rome, Italy	8th	Junior team	146 pts
1983	World Cross Country Championships	Gateshead, United Kingdom	45th	Junior race	27:12
1983	World Cross Country Championships	Gateshead, United Kingdom	9th	Junior team	171 pts
1983	European Junior Championships	Schwechat, Austria	2nd	1500 m	3:41.41
1984	Friendship Games	Moscow, Soviet Union	3rd	1500 m	3:38.42
1985	World Cup	Canberra, Australia	3rd	1500 m	3:41.92
1986	European Championships	Stuttgart, West Germany	11th	1500 m	3:44.80
1986	Goodwill Games	Moscow, Soviet Union	2nd	1500 m	3:40.18
1987	European Indoor Championships	Liévin, France	4th	1500 m	3:46.11

== National championships ==
- Soviet Indoor Athletics Championships
  - 1500 m: 1984, 1987
- Soviet Athletics Championships
  - 1500 : 1985

== Notes ==
Alternative transliterations of his surname include Lotaryev, Lotarev, Lotorev, and a Lotoryev.
