= Sakae Osaki =

Japanese long-distance runner

Personal information
- Nationality: Japanese
- Born: 18 August 1964 (age 61)

Sport
- Sport: Long-distance running
- Event: 10,000 metres

Sakae Osaki (大崎 栄, Ōsaki Sakae; born 18 August 1964) is a Japanese long-distance runner. He competed in the men's 10,000 metres at the 1992 Summer Olympics.
