= Debebe Demisse =

Ethiopian long-distance runner

Debebe Demisse (born 1968) is a retired Ethiopian cross country and marathon runner.

== Achievements ==
Year	Competition	Venue	Position	Event	Notes
Representing Ethiopia
1985	World Cross Country Championships	Lisbon, Portugal	8th	Junior race (8.19 km)	23:11
1986	World Junior Championships	Athens, Greece	6th	5000m	13:59.51
1986	World Junior Championships	Athens, Greece	3rd	10,000m	28:49.09
1987	World Cross Country Championships	Warsaw, Poland	3rd	Junior race (7.05 km)	22:20
1987	World Cross Country Championships	Warsaw, Poland	1st	Team	19 pts
1988	World Cross Country Championships	Auckland, New Zealand	20th	Long race (12 km)	36:15
1988	World Cross Country Championships	Auckland, New Zealand	2nd	Team	103 pts
1989	World Cross Country Championships	Stavanger, Norway	37th	Senior race (12 km)	41:46
1989	World Cross Country Championships	Stavanger, Norway	3rd	Team	162 pts
1990	World Cross Country Championships	Aix-les-Bains, France	27th	Senior race (12.2 km)	35:19
1990	World Cross Country Championships	Aix-les-Bains, France	2nd	Team	96 pts
