= Malcolm Norwood (runner) =

Australian runner

Malcolm Norwood is a medium and long-distance runner from Australia. In 1986, he was the country's National Champion in the 5000 metres race. He competed for Australia in the 1988, 1989, and 1991 IAAF World Championship Cross Country Championships, as well as the 1990 Commonwealth Games, the 1992 World Half Marathon Championship and the 1993 World Championship Marathon.

His professional running career began on July 21, 1984, when he ran in the Victorian Cross Country Championship with a time of 50:02 in the 16 km race. He has competed in a total of 33 professional races in Australia and 6 races in New Zealand. He has also competed in Germany, Japan, Belgium, England, and the United States.

In his marathon debut, he flew to the Midwest to compete in the Twin Cities Marathon, run on October 6, 1991. Norwood said he would have rather run the Chicago Marathon that year, but was swayed to run Twin Cities because the $25,000 prize purse for first place was $17,500 more than Chicago's. More than 5,000 runners started in Minneapolis, Minnesota and headed to the finish line in the state capital city, St. Paul. Norwood battled with a pack of 20, and emerged in the last miles on Summit Avenue with just one other runner, U.S. Olympian Bob Kempainen. With a final kick, Norwood moved ahead, beating Kempainen by only 2 seconds, winning in 2:12:10.

Norwood's lifetime prize purse amounts to $25,350.

== Early and personal life ==
Malcolm Norwood is known for his intense training regimen. He also has professed that he struggles with hyperactivity and uses running as an outlet.

== Achievements ==
Year	Competition	Venue	Position	Event	Notes
Representing Australia
1986	National Championships	Sydney, Australia	1st	5,000 meters	14.11.81
1987	Capitol 10K Race	Adelaide, Australia	1st	10 km	28:22
1988	Australian Road Championships	Canberra, Australia	4th	15 km	45:07
1992	IAAF World Half Marathon Championships	South Shields, England	16th	Half Marathon	1:01:56
1991	Twin Cities Marathon	St. Paul, Minnesota	1st	Marathon	2:12:10
