= Melese Feissa =

Ethiopian long-distance runner

Melese Feissa (born 8 December 1967) is a retired Ethiopian runner who specialized in cross-country running.

== Achievements ==
Year	Competition	Venue	Position	Event	Notes
Representing Ethiopia
1986	World Cross Country Championships	Neuchâtel, Switzerland	1st	Junior race (7.75 km]	22:47.6
1986	World Cross Country Championships	Neuchâtel, Switzerland	1st	Team competition	13 pts
1986	World Junior Championships	Athens, Greece	3rd	5000m	13:56.45
1987	World Cross Country Championships	Warsaw, Poland	39th	Senior race (11.95 km)	37:48
1987	World Cross Country Championships	Warsaw, Poland	3rd	Team competition	161 pts
1988	World Cross Country Championships	Auckland, New Zealand	23rd	Long race (12 km)	36:23
1988	World Cross Country Championships	Auckland, New Zealand	2nd	Team competition	103 pts
1989	World Cross Country Championships	Stavanger, Norway	33rd	Senior race (12 km)	41:43
1989	World Cross Country Championships	Stavanger, Norway	3rd	Team competition	162 pts
1991	World Cross Country Championships	Antwerp, Belgium	13th	Long race (11.764 km)	34:34
1991	World Cross Country Championships	Antwerp, Belgium	2nd	Team competition	104 pts
