= Kōichi Morishita =

Japanese long-distance runner

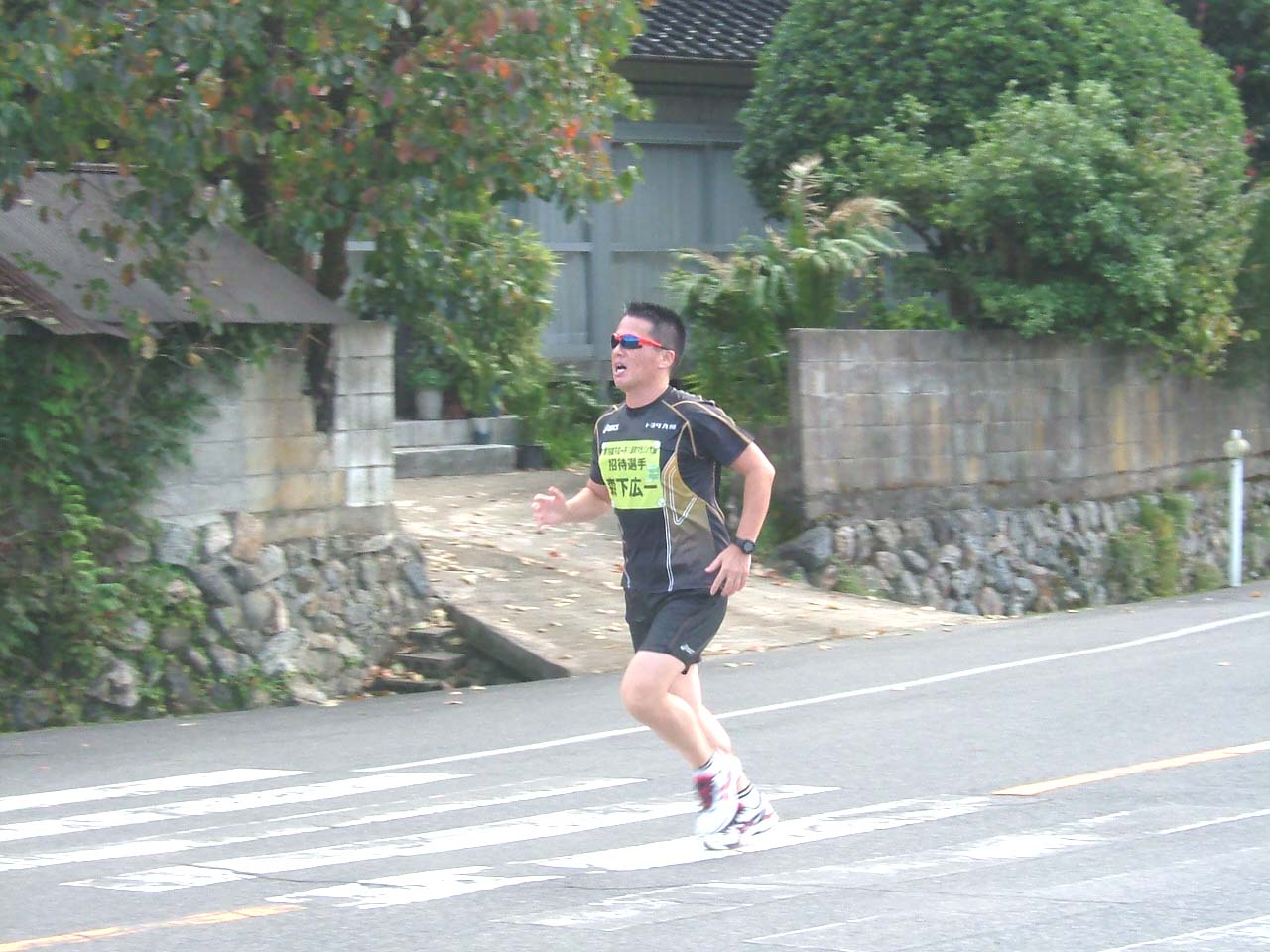
Kōichi Morishita

Kōichi Morishita (森下 広一, Morishita Kōichi; born 5 September 1967) is a retired Japanese male long-distance runner. He competed for Japan at the 1992 Summer Olympics in Barcelona, Spain where he won the silver medal in the men's marathon event.

Morishita was born in Yazu, Tottori. Beyond his Olympic medal, his achievements include wins at the Beppu-Ōita Marathon and the Tokyo International Marathon. His winning time in the former race (2:08:53) was the fastest marathon recorded in 1991.

Since 1999, he has managed the Toyota Kyūshū Athletic team, based in Miyawaka, Fukuoka. He has coached many runners including the late Samuel Wanjiru, who was a member of the team from 2005 to early 2008.

== Achievements ==
Year	Tournament	Venue	Result	Event
1990	Asian Games	Beijing, PR China	1st	10,000 m
1991	World Championships	Tokyo, Japan	10th	10,000 m
1991	Beppu-Ōita Marathon	Beppu-Ōita, Japan	1st	Marathon
1992	Tokyo Marathon	Tokyo, Japan	1st	Marathon
1992	Olympic Games	Barcelona, Spain	2nd	Marathon
