= Athletics at the Friendship Games – Men's 1500 metres =

The men's 1500 metres event at the Friendship Games was held on 18 August 1984 at the Grand Arena of the Central Lenin Stadium in Moscow, Soviet Union.

== Results ==
Rank	Name	Nationality	Time	Notes
1st place, gold medalist(s)	Andreas Busse	East Germany	3:36.65	
2nd place, silver medalist(s)	Anatoliy Kalutskiy	Soviet Union	3:37.85	
3rd place, bronze medalist(s)	Igor Lotaryov	Soviet Union	3:38.42	
4	Abderrazak Bounour	Algeria	3:40.35	
5	Pavel Yakovlev	Soviet Union	3:41.42	
6	Harri Hänninen	Finland	3:41.87	
7	Abderrahmane Morceli	Algeria	3:42.05	
8	Amar Brahmia	Algeria	3:43.42	
9	A. Fetahun	Ethiopia	3:46.78	
10	José Mayorga	Nicaragua	3:57.38	
11	E. Gungaadashiin	Mongolia	3:57.63	
12	José Bautista	Colombia	4:02.23	
13	A. Bah Abdoul	Guinea	4:10.63	
14	T. Cuzbu-Indrussu	Benin	4:11.46	
15	A. Muhammad	South Yemen	4:25.28	
16	Arana Dabo	Guinea-Bissau	4:32.19	
17	P. Prum	Cambodia	4:32.39	

== See also ==
- Athletics at the 1984 Summer Olympics – Men's 1500 metres
