= Tadashi Fukushima (runner) =

Japanese long-distance runner

Tadashi Fukushima (福島 正, Fukushima Tadashi; born 29 September 1964) is a retired long-distance runner from Japan, whose personal best in the men's 10,000 metres was 28:29.29, achieved at the 1993 World Championships. He won the silver medal in the 10,000 m from the 1993 East Asian Games in Shanghai.

== Achievements ==
Year	Competition	Venue	Position	Notes
1993	World Championships	Stuttgart, Germany	15th	10,000 m
