= Hammou Boutayeb =

Moroccan long-distance runner

Hammou Boutayeb (Arabic: حمو بوطيب) (born 1956 in Khemisset) is a Moroccan former long-distance runner. He specialized in the 10,000 metres, and won a silver medal at the World Indoor Championships held in Seville, Spain.

At the 1992 Olympic Games in Barcelona, Boutayeb competed in the 10,000 meter final, He was lapped with three laps to go, but then kept pace with the lead pack of Richard Chelimo and fellow Moroccan Khalid Skah, instead of giving way to them as dictated by the rules. This distracted Chelimo and caused him to lose rhythm. Skah won the race from Chelimo by 1.02 seconds, but was initially disqualified for receiving assistance from Boutayeb. However, Skah appealed and was reinstated.

== International competitions ==
Year	Competition	Venue	Position	Event	Notes
Representing Morocco
1989	Jeux de la Francophonie	Casablanca, Morocco	2nd	10,000 m	
1990	Goodwill Games	Seattle, United States	1st	10,000 m	
1991	World Indoor Championships	Seville, Spain	2nd	3000 m	
1991	Mediterranean Games	Athens, Greece	1st	10,000 m	
1991	World Championships	Tokyo, Japan	8th	10,000 m	
1992	Olympic Games	Barcelona, Spain	DQ'd	10,000m	
1993	Mediterranean Games	Narbonne, France	2nd	10,000 m	
1994	Goodwill Games	St. Petersburg, Russia	1st	10,000 m	
1994	Jeux de la Francophonie	Évry-Bondoufle, France	2nd	10,000 m	
