= Simon Gutierrez =

American runner

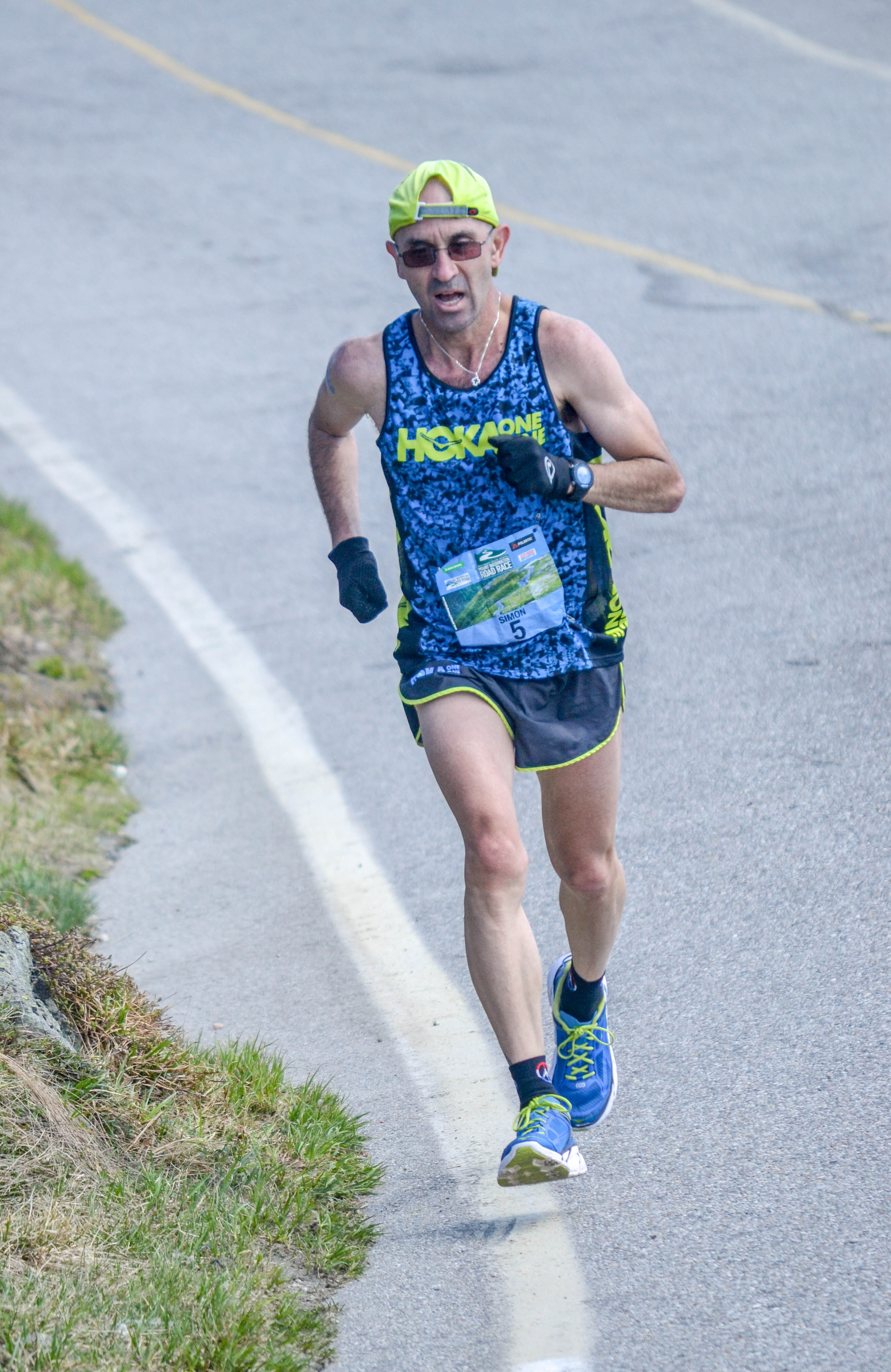

Personal information
- Full name: Simon Gutierrez
- Nationality: American
- Born: March 13, 1966 (age 60)

Simon Gutierrez is an American runner.

At the 1989 IAAF World Cross Country Championships he finished 83rd in the senior men's race.

He is a multiple-time winner of the Mount Washington Road Race.

Gutierrez was the 2005 U.S. Mountain Runner of the Year.

He was the initial inspiration for Joseph Gray.

He is a member of the Colorado Running Hall of Fame.
