= Salvatore Antibo =

Italian long-distance runner

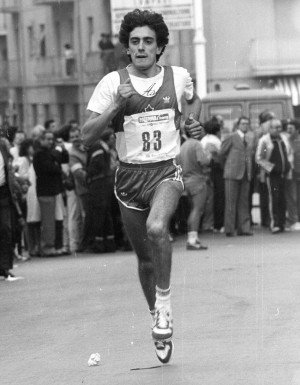

Personal information
- Nickname: Antilope di Altofonte
- Nationality: Italian
- Born: 7 February 1962 (age 64) Altofonte, Italy
- Height: 1.70 m (5 ft 7 in)
- Weight: 52 kg (115 lb)

Sport
- Country: Italy
- Sport: Athletics
- Event: Long-distance running
- Club: G.S. Fiamme Oro; CUS Palermo
- Coached by: Gaspare Polizzi

Achievements and titles
- Personal bests: 5000 m: 13:05.59 (1990); 10000 m: 27:16.50 (1989)
Medal record
Men's athletics
Representing Italy
Event	1st	2nd	3rd
Olympic Games	0	1	0
European Championships	2	0	1
World Cup	1	0	0
European Cup	2	1	1
Total	5	2	2
Olympic Games
Silver medal – second place	1988 Seoul	10,000 m
European Championships
Gold medal – first place	1990 Split	10,000 m
Gold medal – first place	1990 Split	5000 m
Bronze medal – third place	1986 Stuttgart	10,000 m

Salvatore Antibo (born 7 February 1962) is a former long-distance runner from Italy.

He won nine medals at the International athletics competitions. but he never won a national championship (neither outdoor nor indoor).

== Biography ==
Antibo was born on 7 February 1962 in Altofonte, within the province of Palermo (Sicily).

He revealed as a consistent middle-distance runner in the 1984 Summer Olympics in Los Angeles, when he arrived fourth in the 10,000 m final. His national popularity was however overshadowed by his compatriot Alberto Cova, who won the gold medal. After a bronze medal at the 1986 European Championships, behind Stefano Mei and again Cova, he gained the status of Italian number one, winning the silver medal over 10,000 m at the 1988 Summer Olympics in Seoul.

At the 1990 European Championships in Athletics in Split he was victorious over both 10,000 m and 5000 m, becoming one of the most popular sportsmen in his country. He was famous for his unorthodox tactics. In Split, he won the 10,000 m through front-running and the 5000 m with a sprint on the final straight.

In the 10,000 m final at the 1991 World Championships in Athletics in Tokyo, Antibo finished twentieth and last, losing to, for example, Moses Tanui, Richard Chelimo and Khalid Skah. He ran well during the first half of the race, but he slowed down radically during the second half (see, for example, "World Athletics Championships in Tokyo 1991" (Yleisurheilun MM-kisat Tokiossa 1991), The Runner magazine (Juoksija-lehti), Helsinki, 1991). It was eventually revealed that such sudden absences during the races were related to a form of epilepsy.

He retreated from professional athletics after his return from the 1992 Summer Olympics for a seizure in his last run.

== National records ==
- 5000 metres: 13:05.59 ( (Italy) Bologna, 18 July 1990) - 8 September 2020
- 10,000 metres: 27:16.50 ( (Finland) Helsinki, 29 June 1989) - 6 October 2019

== See also ==
- Italian records in athletics
- Italian all-time top lists - 5000 metres
- Italian all-time top lists - 10000 metres
- FIDAL Hall of Fame
- Italy at the Athletics World Cup

Sporting positions
Preceded by Yobes Ondieki	Men's 5000 m Best Year Performance; 1990	Succeeded by Yobes Ondieki
