= Richard Nerurkar =

British long-distance runner

Personal information
- Born: 6 January 1964 (age 62) Wolverhampton, England
- Height: 1.78 m (5 ft 10 in)
- Weight: 64 kg (141 lb)

Sport
- Club: Bingley Harriers
- Coached by: Bruce Tulloh

Richard David Nerurkar MBE (born 6 January 1964) is a former track and field athlete from Great Britain, competing in the long-distance running events. He participated in the 1992 Summer Olympics and the 1996 Summer Olympics.

== Biography ==
Nerurkar was born in Wolverhampton, England, to an Indian father and English mother, he moved to Bradford, where he attended Bradford Grammar School. He has a brother and sister. He was a language teacher at Marlborough College between 1989 and 1991.

Nerurkar became the British 10,000 metres champion after winning the British AAA Championships title at the 1990 AAA Championships. He won the English national cross-country championship three times and twice finished in the top 20 in the World Cross-Country Championships. On the track, he finished fifth in the 10,000 metres in the 1991 World Championships in Tokyo. At the 1992 Olympic Games in Barcelona, he represented Great Britain and finished 17th in the 10,000m final.

He held the British record for 10 miles of 46:02, set in October 1993 (and which wasn't broken until March 2023 by Emile Cairess). That year he moved up in distance to the marathon.

He won his debut marathon in Hamburg in a time of 2:10:57 and went on to win his second marathon, the World Cup Marathon in San Sebastián, in October 1993. His other marathons included a personal best time of 2:08:36 in the 1997 London Marathon where he also finished in fifth place. His time was the third fastest of all time by a British athlete and is the fourth fastest as of 2016. His greatest performance was arguably at the 1996 Olympic Games in Atlanta, representing Great Britain he finished in fifth place.

Nerurkar is general manager of the Great Ethiopian Run event hosted yearly in Addis Ababa, an event he started in 2001 with Ethiopian long-distance runner Haile Gebrselassie. He is the author of the book Marathon Running: From Beginning to Elite (ISBN 978-0713668308).

His son Lukas Nerurkar is a professional cyclist.

He was awarded the MBE in 2002.

== Achievements ==
Year	Competition	Venue	Position	Event	Notes
Representing Great Britain
1989	Universiade	Duisburg, West Germany	12th	5000 m	14:03.07
1990	European Championships	Split, Yugoslavia	5th	10,000 m	28:07.81
1991	World Championships	Tokyo, Japan	5th	10,000 m	27:57.14
1992	Olympic Games	Barcelona, Spain	17th	10,000 m	28:48.48
1993	Hamburg Marathon	Hamburg, Germany	1st	Marathon	2:10:57
1993	World Cup Marathon	San Sebastián, Spain	1st	Marathon	2:10:03
1994	European Championships	Helsinki, Finland	4th	Marathon	2:11:56
1995	World Championships	Gothenburg, Sweden	7th	Marathon	2:15:47
1996	Olympic Games	Atlanta, United States	5th	Marathon	2:13:39
1998	European Championships	Budapest, Hungary	8th	Marathon	2:14:02

== Personal bests ==
Distance	Mark	Date	Location
3,000 metres	7:48.00	1992	Nice
5,000 metres	13:23.26	1990	Brussels
10,000 metres	27:40.03	1993	Oslo
Half Marathon	1:01:06	1996	Ivry-sur-Seine
Marathon	2:08:36	1997	London
