= Carlo Terzer =

Italian long-distance runner

Personal information
- Nationality: Italian
- Born: 12 October 1955 (age 70)

Sport
- Country: Italy
- Sport: Athletics
- Event(s): Long-distance running Marathon

Achievements and titles
- Personal best: Half marathon: 2:14:49 (1991)

Carlo Terzer (born 12 October 1955) is a former Italian male long-distance runner who competed at three editions of the IAAF World Cross Country Championships at senior level (1989, 1990, 1991). He won one national championships at senior level (1988 marathon).
