= Paul McCloy =

Canadian long-distance runner

Personal information
- Born: 6 November 1963 (age 62) St. John's, Newfoundland and Labrador, Canada

Sport
- Sport: Long-distance running
- Event: 10,000 metres
Medal record
Representing Canada
Pan American Games
| Bronze medal – third place | 1987 Indianapolis | 10,000m |

Paul McCloy (born 6 November 1963) is a Canadian long-distance runner. He competed in the men's 10,000 metres at the 1988 Summer Olympics. McCloy won a bronze medal at the 1987 Pan American Games in the 10,000 metres. His Canadian record for the men's 10k road race (28:17), set in Orlando Florida on 21 February 1987 held for over 35 years until June 26, 2022 when Ben Flanagan from Kitchener, Ont., ran 28 minutes 11 seconds (28:11) at the BAA 10K competition in Boston. McCloy continues to hold the course record for the annual Tely 10 Road Race held in his hometown of St. John's, NL, with a time of 47:04 over 10 miles set in 1985.
