= Harri Hänninen =

Finnish long-distance runner

Harri Hänninen (born 18 October 1963, in Helsinki) is a retired Finnish male long-distance runner who specialized in the marathon.

== International competitions ==
Year	Competition	Venue	Position	Event	Notes
Representing Finland
1984	Friendship Games	Moscow, Soviet Union	6th	1500 m	3:41.87
1986	European Indoor Championships	Madrid, Spain	19th (h)	1500 m	3:57.25
1990	European Championships	Split, Yugoslavia	8th	5,000 m	13:28.22 PB
1990	European Championships	Split, Yugoslavia	19th	10,000 m	29:07.53
1990	Berlin Marathon	Berlin, West Germany	5th	Marathon	2:12:40
1992	Olympic Games	Barcelona, Spain	11th	Marathon	2:15:19
1992	Berlin Marathon	Berlin, Germany	4th	Marathon	2:13:06
1993	Rotterdam Marathon	Rotterdam, Netherlands	3rd	Marathon	2:11.58
1993	World Championships	Stuttgart, Germany	30th	Marathon	2:28:07
1994	European Championships	Helsinki, Finland	8th	Marathon	2:13:21
1995	World Championships	Gothenburg, Sweden	30th	Marathon	2:22:43
1996	Olympic Games	Atlanta, United States	32nd	Marathon	2:18:41
1998	European Championships	Budapest, Hungary	14th	Marathon	2:15:13

=== Personal bests ===
- 5000 metres - 13:28.22 minutes (1990)
- 10,000 metres - 28:00.73 minutes (1989)
