= Are Nakkim =

Norwegian long-distance runner

Medal record

Men's athletics

Representing Norway

European Championships
Silver medal – second place	1990 Split	10,000 m

Are Nakkim (born 13 February 1964) is a retired Norwegian long-distance runner who specialized in the 10,000 metres. He represented Moss IL during his active career.

Are Nakkim attended Boston University, where he ran cross country and track.

He won a silver medal in 10,000 m at the 1990 European Championships. He also competed in 3000 metres steeplechase at the 1986 European Championships as well as the World Cross Country Championships in 1989, 1990, 1991 and 1992 without any success. In 10,000 m he became Norwegian champion only once, in 1984. He did win the 3000 m chase in 1985–1986 and 5000 m in 1986 and 1988–1990.

His personal best time in 10,000 m was 27:32.52 minutes, achieved in July 1990 on Bislett stadion. This is the current Norwegian record. In 5000 m he held the Norwegian record with 13:19.82 minutes until 2000, when it was broken by Marius Bakken. In 3000 m s'chase Nakkim is third with 8:24.13 minutes, only behind Jim Svenøy and Espen Borge.
