= Kipkemboi Kimeli =

Kenyan long-distance runner

Kipkemboi Kimeli (November 30, 1966 – February 6, 2010) was a Kenyan long-distance runner who won the bronze medal in the 10,000 metres at the 1988 Seoul Olympics.

Kimeli died in Albuquerque, New Mexico from complications from pneumonia and tuberculosis on February 6, 2010 at the age of 43.

== Achievements ==
Year	Competition	Venue	Position	Event	Notes
Representing Kenya
1985	World Cross Country Championships	Lisbon, Portugal	1st	Junior race	
1988	Olympic Games	Seoul, South Korea	3rd	10,000 m	
1989	World Cross Country Championships	Stavanger, Norway	8th	Long race	
1989	World Cross Country Championships	Stavanger, Norway	1st	Team	
