= Vicente Polo =

Spanish diplomat

Vicente Polo was a Spanish diplomat who served as first commercial attaché and then as chargé d'affaires at the Spanish embassy in Moscow from April to July 1938.

== Diplomat ==
Polo was among the staff of the Moscow embassy of the Second Spanish Republic to the Soviet Union from October 1936 in Moscow. The original task he had been assigned, as commercial attaché, meant that he was the next senior diplomat in the Embassy after Marcelino Pascua, the ambassador. Therefore he ran the embassy during Pascua’s trips home. This was also due to an extreme staff shortage at the embassy, due to the lack of interest in the Republic in their normative diplomacy with Moscow following the perceived rise of Communist subterfuge in the Spanish Civil War, and similar lack of necessity for the Soviets to make their overtures through the normative embassy.

When Pascua was recalled in April 1938, Polo took over the embassy but was never appointed Ambassador, nor was he paid well: His personal expenses funded the Republican embassy, including a function on the 14th April 1938, which Polo hosted to celebrate the Spanish Republic’s seventh anniversary. Polo refused charity from Pascua to keep the embassy going despite his much smaller salary of 2,600 francs plus another 6,241 for expenses compared to Pascua and his 12,856 franc-salary and 43,712 franc expenses allowance.

From July 1938 Polo was recalled and replaced by former commercial attaché Manuel Pederoso.
