= Fernando Couto (runner) =

Portuguese long-distance runner

Personal information
- Full name: Fernando Fontes Couto
- Nationality: Portuguese
- Born: 4 December 1959 (age 65)

Sport
- Sport: Long-distance running
- Event: 5000 metres

Fernando Fontes Couto (born 4 December 1959) is a Portuguese long-distance runner. He competed in the men's 5000 metres at the 1988 Summer Olympics and in the men's 10000 metres at the 1992 Summer Olympics.
