= Haruo Urata =

Japanese long-distance runner

Medal record

Men's athletics

Representing Japan

Asian Championships
Silver medal – second place	1985 Jakarta	5000 m

Haruo Urata (浦田 春生, Urata Haruo) (born 9 March 1962 in Kumamoto) is a retired long-distance runner from Japan, who represented his native country at the 1992 Summer Olympics. His personal best in the men's 10,000 metres was 28:18.15, achieved at the 1991 World Championships. Urata won four national titles during his career: in the 5000 metres (1988 and 1989) and in the 10,000 metres (1988 and 1989).

== International competitions ==
Year	Competition	Venue	Position	Event	Notes
1985	Asian Championships	Jakarta, Indonesia	2nd	5000 m	
1991	World Championships	Tokyo, Japan	11th	10,000 m	
1992	Olympic Games	Barcelona, Spain	14th	10,000 m	
