= Stanley Mandebele =

Zimbabwean long-distance runner

Personal information
- Nationality: Zimbabwean
- Born: 6 June 1962
- Died: Before 2008

Sport
- Sport: Long-distance running
- Event: 5000 metres

Stanley Mandebele (born 6 June 1962, died before 2008) was a Zimbabwean long-distance runner. He competed in the men's 5000 metres at the 1988 Summer Olympics.
