= Raffaello Alliegro =

Italian long-distance runner (born 1964)

Personal information
- Nationality: Italian
- Born: 30 May 1964 (age 62)

Sport
- Country: Italy
- Sport: Athletics
- Event: Long-distance running

Achievements and titles
- Personal best: Half marathon: 1:02:13 (1990)

Raffaello Alliegro (born 30 May 1964) is an Italian retired long-distance runner who competed at three editions of the IAAF World Cross Country Championships at senior level (1988, 1989, 1990). He won one national championship at senior level (1991 half marathon).
