= Paul Arpin =

French long-distance runner

Paul Arpin (born 20 February 1960 in Bourg-Saint-Maurice) is a retired long-distance runner from France, who represented his native country in the men's 10,000 metres at the 1988 Summer Olympics, finishing in seventh place.

Paul Arpin also finished third at the 1987 IAAF World Cross Country Championships behind Kenyans John Ngugi and Paul Kipkoech. He was also part of the bronze medal-winning French team at the 1988 edition behind Kenya and Ethiopia (Paul Arpin finished 11th individually)

== Achievements ==
| Year | Competition | Venue | Position | Event | Notes |
Representing France
| 1986 | European Championships | Stuttgart, West Germany | — | 10,000m | DNF |
| 1987 | World Cross Country Championships | Warsaw, Poland | 3rd | Long race (11.95 km) | 36:51 |
| 1987 | World Championships | Rome, Italy | 13th | 10,000 m | 28:29.21 |
| 1988 | Olympic Games | Seoul, South Korea | 7th | 10,000 m | 27:39.36 |
| 1990 | European Championships | Split, Yugoslavia | 17th | 10,000m | 28:38.67 |
