= Giuseppe Miccoli =

Italian long-distance runner

Personal information
- Nationality: Italian
- Born: 21 November 1961 (age 64)

Sport
- Country: Italy
- Sport: Athletics
- Event: Long-distance running

Achievements and titles
- Personal best: 10,000 m: 28:08.96 (1990)

Giuseppe Miccoli (born 21 November 1961) is a former Italian male long-distance runner who competed at five editions of the IAAF World Cross Country Championships at senior level (from 1986 to 1991). He won two national championships at senior level (1987, 1988).
