= John Woods (runner) =

Irish long-distance runner

Personal information
- Nationality: Irish
- Born: 8 December 1955 (age 70) Liverpool, England

Sport
- Sport: Long-distance running
- Event: Marathon

John Woods (born 8 December 1955) is an Irish long-distance runner. He competed in the men's marathon at the 1988 Summer Olympics.

Woods was a member of the Liverpool Harriers athletic club.
