= Aaron Ramirez =

American long-distance runner

Personal information
- Born: July 29, 1964 (age 61) Mission, Texas, United States

Sport
- Sport: Long-distance running
- Event: 10,000 metres
- College team: Arizona Wildcats

Aaron Ramirez (born July 29, 1964) is an American long-distance runner. He competed in the men's 10,000 metres at the 1992 Summer Olympics. Competing for the Arizona Wildcats, he won the 1986 NCAA Division I cross country championships.
