= Armando Quintanilla =

Mexican long-distance runner

Personal information
- Full name: Juan Armando Quintanilla Loredo
- Born: April 19, 1968 (age 58) San Luis Potosí, Mexico
Medal record
Men's Athletics
Representing Mexico
Pan American Games
Gold medal – first place	1995 Mar del Plata	5.000 metres
Gold medal – first place	1995 Mar del Plata	10.000 metres

Juan Armando Quintanilla Loredo (born April 19, 1968) is a retired long-distance runner from Mexico, who won two gold medals at the 1995 Pan American Games in Mar del Plata, Argentina: in the men's 5.000 and 10.000 metres. He competed in three consecutive Summer Olympics, starting in 1992.
