= Khalid Skah =

Moroccan long-distance runner

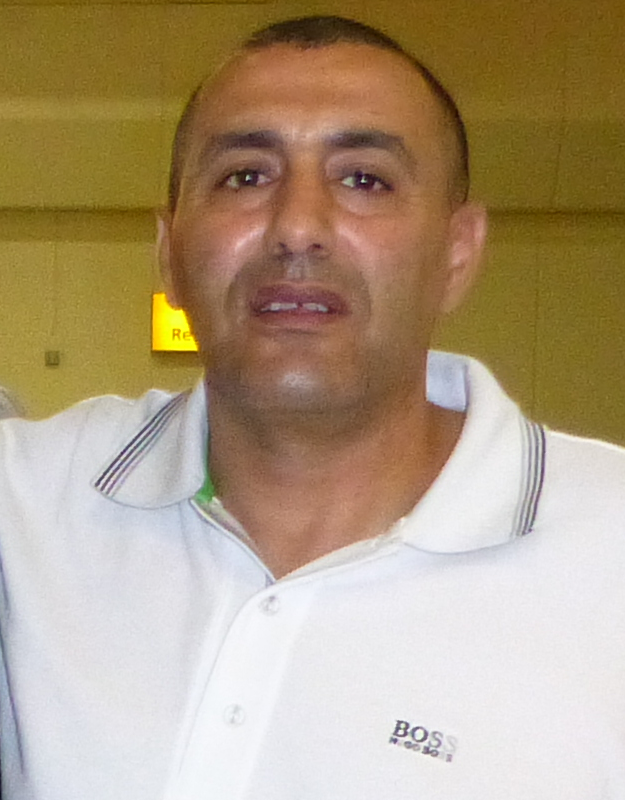
- Skah in London in 2012

Personal information
- Born: 29 January 1967 (age 59) Midelt, Morocco

Sport
- Sport: Track and field
Medal record
Representing Morocco
Olympic Games
Gold medal – first place	1992 Barcelona	10,000 m
World Championships
Silver medal – second place	1995 Gothenburg	10,000 m
Bronze medal – third place	1991 Tokyo	10,000 m
African Championships
Gold medal – first place	1990 Cairo	10,000 m
Mediterranean Games
Gold medal – first place	1993 Narbonne	10,000 m

Khalid Skah (Arabic: خالد سكاح) (born 29 January 1967) is a Moroccan track and field athlete, winner of the 10,000 metres at the 1992 Summer Olympics.

Born in Midelt, Morocco, Skah established himself first as a good cross country runner by winning the IAAF World Cross Country Championships in 1990 and 1991.

== Racing career ==
=== 1991 World Championships ===
His first major tournament on track was the 1991 World Championships where he first won a bronze in 10,000 m and then finished sixth at the 5000 m run. This was a disappointing outcome for Skah as, earlier in the season, he had won the 10000 m race in Oslo against a very strong field and had emerged as one of the favourites for the finals in Tokyo. However, for the 10 000 m final Richard Chelimo and the eventual world champion, Moses Tanui (both of Kenya), employed some very elaborate tactics and worked as a team. By the time of the 5000 m final Skah was probably tired. Yobes Ondieki of Kenya, who won the gold medal in the 5000 m, had expected Skah to be his major rival.

=== 1992 Olympics ===
The following year, at the Barcelona Olympics, Skah met Chelimo again. With three laps remaining in the 10,000 m final, the two athletes were clear and battling for the gold medal. At this point the pair came to lap another Moroccan athlete, Hammou Boutayeb, who stayed with the leaders even after being lapped. The rules state that a lapped runner cannot "assist" another runner but, although Boutayeb's actions were interpreted as unsportsmanlike by the crowd, it was not certain that there was collusion. Nevertheless, Skah gained advantage, Chelimo was disadvantaged. These events incensed the Spanish crowd, and the Swedish track judge Carl-Gustav Tollemar attempted to stop Boutayeb.

Skah sprinted ahead of Chelimo in the final 150 m to claim victory, but was immediately disqualified, prompting cheers from the crowd. For about 14 hours, Chelimo was the Olympic champion. However, the Moroccan team appealed, and by the next morning, Skah was reinstated. The jury of appeal ruled that rule 143.2, which prohibited assistance, lacked a defined penalty, which rendered it effectively unenforceable. At the medal ceremony, Skah was met with boos, while the crowd reserved their applause for Chelimo.

=== Other races ===
In 1993 Skah won the 5000 m race at Weltklasse Zürich. However, he finished fifth in 5000 m at the 1993 World Championships. He ran his only world record in 2 miles (8:12.17) in the same season. He won the 1994 World Semi-Marathon Championships and finished second in 10,000 m at the 1995 World Championships.

Skah's last major international meet was the 1996 Summer Olympics, where he finished seventh in the 10 000 m. In 1995, Skah was given Norwegian citizenship, where he lived and trained with athletes club B.U.L. After that, the Moroccan Athletics Association banned him from international competitions. Skah was reinstated in 2001, after which he tried a comeback to re-establish himself as one of the world's best long-distance runners, finishing tenth in the World Half Marathon Championships that year.

== Personal life ==
In June 2013, Skah was arrested at Orly Airport in Paris following an extradition request from Norway, where he was sought for alleged child abduction. Skah had been engaged in a long-running custody dispute with his Norwegian ex-wife, Anne Cecilie Hopstock, over their two children, Tarik and Selma. The case escalated into a diplomatic controversy after Norway admitted to assisting the children in leaving Morocco. In 2009, the teenagers reportedly fled their father's home, seeking help from the Norwegian embassy in Rabat. They were sheltered at the ambassador's residence before being smuggled out of the country on a yacht to Spain. While Norway confirmed that one of its diplomats had hidden the children, it denied official involvement in their escape, stating that two special forces members who aided them were off duty at the time. Morocco accused Norwegian officials of violating the Vienna Convention on Diplomatic Relations and called for legal action. Meanwhile, both Skah and Hopstock had been granted custody in their respective countries, though by 2013, the children were legal adults.

Sporting positions
Preceded by Saïd Aouita	Men's 3,000 m Best Year Performance; 1990	Succeeded by Dieter Baumann
Preceded by Carl Thackery	Men's Zevenheuvelenloop Winner (15 km); 1993	Succeeded by Haile Gebrselassie
