= Kozu Akutsu =

Japanese long-distance runner

Medal record

Men's athletics

Representing Japan

Asian Championships
Gold medal – first place	1985 Jakarta	5000 m

Kozu Akutsu (阿久津 浩三, Akutsu Kōzō; born November 11, 1960 in Nasu, Tochigi) is a retired Japanese long-distance runner. He represented his country Japan at the 1988 Summer Olympics. His personal bests were 13:46.29 in the 5,000 metres and 28:45.89 in the 10,000 metres, both achieved at the 1987 World Championships.

== Achievements ==
Year	Competition	Venue	Position	Event
1985	Asian Championships	Jakarta, Indonesia	1st	5000 m
1987	World Championships	Rome, Italy	20th	10,000 m
1988	Olympic Games	Seoul, South Korea	14th	10,000 m
