= José Manuel Albentosa =

Spanish long-distance runner

José Manuel Albentosa Ferrer (born January 21, 1964, in Alicante) is a retired long-distance runner from Spain. He represented his native country in the men's 10.000 metres at the 1988 Summer Olympics in Seoul, South Korea.

== Achievements ==
Year	Competition	Venue	Position	Event	Notes
Representing Spain
1986	European Championships	Stuttgart, West Germany	23rd (h)	5000m	13:49.86
1986	Ibero-American Championships	La Habana, Cuba	5th	5000m	13:55.40
1988	Olympic Games	Seoul, South Korea	—	10,000 m	DNF
1990	European Championships	Split, Yugoslavia	6th	10,000 m	28:11.00
1991	World Championships	Tokyo, Japan	28th (h)	10,000 m	29:20.92
