= Zoltán Káldy =

Hungarian long-distance runner

Zoltán Káldy (born 7 January 1969 in Győr, Győr-Moson-Sopron) is a retired Hungarian long-distance runner who specialized in the 10,000 metres.

== Achievements ==
Year	Competition	Venue	Position	Event	Notes
Representing Hungary
1986	World Junior Championships	Athens, Greece	12th	10,000m	30:34.59
1987	European Junior Championships	Birmingham, England	3rd	10,000 m	29:26.84
1987	European Junior Championships	Birmingham, England	—	20 km run	DNF
1988	World Junior Championships	Sudbury, Canada	5th	10,000m	29:08.36
1988	World Junior Championships	Sudbury, Canada	4th	20 km road run	1:00:54
1990	European Championships	Split, Yugoslavia	9th	10,000 m	28:13.71
1992	Olympic Games	Barcelona, Spain	12th	10,000 m	28:34.21
1993	World Championships	Stuttgart, Germany	13th	5,000 m	13:43.02
1994	European Championships	Helsinki, Finland	19th (h)	5000m	13:45.70
1994	European Championships	Helsinki, Finland	12th	10,000m	28:22.00
1996	Olympic Games	Atlanta, United States	16th	10,000 m	28:45.48
