= Cyrille Laventure =

French long-distance runner

Cyrille Laventure (born 29 March 1964 in Fort-de-France, Martinique) is a French athlete who specializes in 5,000 meters. Laventure competed at the 1988 Summer Olympics .
