= Jean-Louis Prianon =

French long-distance runner

Jean-Louis Prianon (born February 22, 1960, in Saint-Joseph, Réunion) is a retired long-distance runner from France, who represented his native country in the men's 10,000 metres at the 1988 Summer Olympics, finishing in fourth place.

== Achievements ==
Year	Competition	Venue	Position	Event	Notes
Representing France
1986	European Championships	Stuttgart, West Germany	8th	10,000m	28:12.29
1987	World Championships	Rome, Italy	9th	10,000 m	28:19.47
1988	Olympic Games	Seoul, South Korea	4th	10,000 m	27:35.43
1989	Jeux de la Francophonie	Morocco	3rd	10,000 m	29:20.00
1990	European Championships	Split, Yugoslavia	13th	10,000m	28:21.71
1993	Corrida de Langueux	Langueux, France	1st	11.8 km	34:51
