= Ezequiel Canário =

Portuguese long-distance runner

Personal information
- Full name: Ezequiel Mendonca Canário
- Nationality: Portuguese
- Born: 10 April 1960 (age 66)

Sport
- Sport: Long-distance running
- Event: 5000 metres

Ezequiel Mendonca Canário (born 10 April 1960) is a Portuguese long-distance runner. He competed in the men's 5000 metres at the 1984 Summer Olympics.
