= Thierry Pantel =

French long-distance runner

Thierry Pantel (born 6 July 1964) is a French former long-distance runner who competed in the 1992 Summer Olympics.
