= John Halvorsen =

Norwegian long-distance runner

Personal information
- Born: 17 August 1966 (age 60) Oslo, Norway

Sport
- Sport: Long-distance running

John Halvorsen (born 17 August 1966) is a retired Norwegian long-distance runner who specialized in 10,000 metres and cross-country running. He represented IF Minerva.

In 10,000 m he finished sixteenth at the 1988 Summer Olympics, twelfth at the 1990 European Championships and nineteenth at the 1992 Summer Olympics. At the 1987 World Championships he competed in both 10,000 m and 5000 m without reaching the finals. His highest place from the IAAF World Cross Country Championships was a tenth place from 1989. He also attended University of Ottawa and is also a record 4 times Canadian University (CIAU / U Sports) Cross Country Champion (1986, 87, 88, 90) and a 5 times all Canadian as well as two times Canadian Cross Country Champion and won several Canadian 10K Road Championships.

He was very successful on the US Road Racing Circuit and was the 1989 Runners World Road Racer of the Year and won several of the major US Road Races including the Lilac Bloomsday 12 km, Gaspatilla 15 km, Red Lobster 10 km, Boston Milk Run and holds the 14th fastest all-time 12 km Road Race Performance. He was a three time winner of the challenging Virginia 10 Miler (1989, 1990, 1992), with a best time of 47:40.

He is the past Race Director for the Ottawa Race Weekend featuring the Ottawa Marathon and the Ottawa 10K for which he held the course record for 20 years (28:12 set in 1988) He was a founding organizer of the Canada Army Run also held in Ottawa. He became Norwegian champion in 5000 m in 1992 and 1993 and in 10,000 m in 1986 and 1991-1993.

He currently is a World Athletics Grade A road race course measurer and president of ENGNE who organizes FIS level cross country ski events in Gatineau, QC

== Personal bests ==
- 5000 metres - 13:20.44 min (1989) - 6th among Norwegian 5000 m runners, only behind Marius Bakken, Sindre Buraas, Henrik Ingebrigtsen, Jakob Ingebrigtsen and Are Nakkim.
- 10,000 metres - 27:43.34 min (1990) - third among Norwegian 10,000 m runners, only behind Are Nakkim and Knut Kvalheim.
- Half marathon - 1:03:15 hrs (1992) - eleventh among Norwegian half marathon runners.
