= Moses Tanui =

Kenyan long-distance runner

Medal record

Men's athletics

Representing Kenya

World Championships
| Gold medal – first place | 1991 Tokyo | 10,000 m |
| Silver medal – second place | 1993 Stuttgart | 10,000 m |

World Half Marathon Championships
| Gold medal – first place | 1995 Montbéliard | Half marathon |
| Silver medal – second place | 1997 Košice | Half marathon |

World Cross Country Championships
| Silver medal – second place | 1990 Aixs-Les-Bains | Cross Country |
| Silver medal – second place | 1991 Antwerp | Cross Country |

African Championships
| Silver medal – second place | 1989 Lagos | 10,000 m |
| Bronze medal – third place | 1989 Lagos | 5000 m |

Moses Tanui (born 20 August 1965 in Sugoi, Nandi District, Kenya) is a former Kenyan long-distance runner who won the gold medal over 10,000m at the 1991 World Championships in Athletics in Tokyo.

== Biography ==
At the 1993 World Championships in Athletics in Stuttgart he finished second after a controversial incident on the final lap in which he lost one shoe after the eventual winner Haile Gebrselassie stepped repeatedly, lap after lap as a race video reveals, upon Tanui's heels. He also won the 100th Boston Marathon in 1996 as well as the 102nd Boston Marathon in 1998. Tanui won the IAAF World Half Marathon Championships in 1995 and silver in the 1997 competition.

He was the first athlete to run a half marathon in less than one hour by running 59:47 in Milan on 3 April 1993. His record was broken five years later by fellow Kenyan Paul Tergat.

At the Chicago Marathon in 1999, Tanui helped spur Khalid Khannouchi to a new world record, eventually finishing 2nd in 2:06:16, which was a Kenyan national record and the third fastest marathon in history at that point.

He was still active in 2004 when he competed at the Seoul International Marathon. He retired later due to a knee injury. Today he operates a training camp in Kaptagat . Tanui has also initiated two of Eldoret's most prominent events, the Discovery Cross Country race, and the Eldoret City Marathon.

He was involved in a serious car accident near Nakuru in February 2010 suffering major injuries to his leg and chest. David Lelei, another former runner, was driving Tanui's car and died in the accident.

== Achievements ==
- All results regarding marathon, unless stated otherwise

| Year | Competition | Venue | Position | Notes |
Representing Kenya
| 1996 | Boston Marathon | Boston, United States | 1st | 2:09:15 |
| 1998 | Boston Marathon | Boston, United States | 1st | 2:07:34 |
| 1999 | Chicago Marathon | Chicago, United States | 2nd | 2:06:16 |
| 2000 | Chicago Marathon | Chicago, United States | 3rd | 2:07:47 |
| 2002 | Vienna Marathon | Vienna, Austria | 1st | 2:10:25 |

Records
| Preceded by (Mexico) Dionicio Cerón | Men's Half Marathon World Record Holder; 3 April 1993 – 4 April 1998 | Succeeded by (Kenya) Paul Tergat |
Sporting positions
| Preceded by Benson Masya | Men's Half Marathon Best Year Performance; 1993 | Succeeded by Benson Masya |
