= 1985 IAAF World Cross Country Championships – Senior men's race =

Senior men's race at the 1985 IAAF World Cross Country Championships
- Organisers: IAAF
- Edition: 13th
- Date: March 24
- Host city: Lisbon, Portugal
- Venue: Sports Complex of Jamor
- Events: 1
- Distances: 12.19 km – Senior men
- Participation: 298 athletes from 47 nations

The Senior men's race at the 1985 IAAF World Cross Country Championships was held in Lisbon, Portugal, at the Sports Complex of Jamor on March 24, 1985. A report on the event was given in the Glasgow Herald.

Complete results, medallists, and the results of British athletes were published.

== Race results ==
=== Senior men's race (12.19 km) ===
==== Individual ====
Rank	Athlete	Country	Time
1st place, gold medalist(s)	Carlos Lopes	Portugal	33:33
2nd place, silver medalist(s)	Paul Kipkoech	Kenya	33:37
3rd place, bronze medalist(s)	Wodajo Bulti	Ethiopia	33:38
4	Bekele Debele	Ethiopia	33:45
5	John Treacy	Ireland	33:48
6	Kassa Balcha	Ethiopia	33:51
7	Christoph Herle	West Germany	33:53
8	Abdelrazzak Bounour	Algeria	33:54
9	Pierre Levisse	France	33:56
10	Bruce Bickford	United States	33:57
11	Fernando Mamede	Portugal	33:59
12	Pat Porter	United States	34:02
13	Antonio Leitão	Portugal	34:04
14	Andrew Masai	Kenya	34:06
15	Viktor Chumakov	Soviet Union	34:08
16	Ed Eyestone	United States	34:09
17	Boniface Merande	Kenya	34:10
18	Dave Lewis	England	34:12
19	Craig Virgin	United States	34:12
20	Rob de Castella	Australia	34:17
21	Antonio Prieto	Spain	34:19
22	Joshua Kipkemboi	Kenya	34:20
23	Franco Boffi	Italy	34:21
24	David Murphy	England	34:21
25	Tommy Ekblom	Finland	34:22
26	Dave Clarke	England	34:23
27	Gelindo Bordin	Italy	34:24
28	Girma Berhanu	Ethiopia	34:24
29	John Woods	Ireland	34:24
30	Stanley Mandebele	Zimbabwe	34:25
31	José da Silva	Brazil	34:26
32	Vicente Polo	Spain	34:27
33	Chala Urgessa	Ethiopia	34:28
34	Jean-Louis Prianon	France	34:29
35	Richard O'Flynn	Ireland	34:30
36	Francesco Panetta	Italy	34:33
37	Steve Jones	Wales	34:34
38	Féthi Baccouche	Tunisia	34:34
39	Salvatore Nicosia	Italy	34:35
40	Mark Curp	United States	34:36
41	Jackson Ruto	Kenya	34:38
42	John Robson	Scotland	34:39
43	Garry Briggs	Australia	34:39
44	João de Sousa	Brazil	34:42
45	James Kipngetich	Kenya	34:44
46	Gianni Demadonna	Italy	34:45
47	Lars-Erik Nilsson	Sweden	34:47
48	Nat Muir	Scotland	34:48
49	Klaas Lok	Netherlands	34:48
50	Eddy de Pauw	Belgium	34:49
51	Wang Helin	China	34:50
52	Pere Arco	Spain	34:50
53	Constantino Esparcia	Spain	34:52
54	Rex Wilson	New Zealand	34:52
55	Hailu Wolde Tsadik	Ethiopia	34:52
56	Jeff Drenth	United States	34:53
57	Hans-Jürgen Orthmann	West Germany	34:54
58	Mark Stickley	United States	34:55
59	Satoshi Kato	Japan	34:55
60	Zephaniah Ncube	Zimbabwe	34:56
61	Graham Clews	Australia	34:56
62	Abdellah Boubia	Morocco	34:57
63	Brian Sheriff	Zimbabwe	34:58
64	Hannu Okkola	Finland	34:59
65	Jos Maes	Belgium	34:59
66	Ari Paunonen	Finland	35:00
67	Ivan Konovalov	Soviet Union	35:00
68	Emmanuel Handzos	Greece	35:01
69	Mats Erixon	Sweden	35:01
70	Ronnie Carroll	Ireland	35:02
71	Vesa Kähkölä	Finland	35:02
72	John Bowden	New Zealand	35:02
73	Paul McCloy	Canada	35:02
74	Francisco Sánchez	Spain	35:03
75	Michael Scheytt	West Germany	35:03
76	David Barney	United States	35:04
77	Konrad Dobler	West Germany	35:04
78	Alain Bordeleau	Canada	35:05
79	Antonio Humberto	Colombia	35:08
80	Habib Romdani	Tunisia	35:08
81	Jan Hagelbrand	Sweden	35:09
82	Eloi Schleder	Brazil	35:10
83	Fernando Couto	Portugal	35:10
84	Dominique Coux	France	35:11
85	Paul Arpin	France	35:11
86	Carey Nelson	Canada	35:12
87	Marti ten Kate	Netherlands	35:13
88	Marco Gozzano	Italy	35:16
89	Abel Antón	Spain	35:16
90	Miloud Djellal	Algeria	35:17
91	Jean-Pierre Paumen	Belgium	35:17
92	Mohamed El Bali	Morocco	35:18
93	Larbi El Mouadden	Morocco	35:18
94	Andrew Lloyd	Australia	35:19
95	Antti Loikkanen	Finland	35:19
96	Valentin Rodríguez	Spain	35:19
97	Gerard Kiernan	Ireland	35:19
98	Michihiko Narita	Japan	35:20
99	Marius Hasler	Switzerland	35:21
100	Zoltán Kadlót	Hungary	35:21
101	Tommy Persson	Sweden	35:21
102	Steve Moneghetti	Australia	35:22
103	Abdelkader Kada	Morocco	35:22
104	Ieuan Ellis	Wales	35:22
105	Oddmund Roalkvam	Norway	35:23
106	Adugna Lema	Ethiopia	35:23
107	Peter Rusman	Netherlands	35:23
108	Robert Schneider	West Germany	35:23
109	Patrick Clabaut	France	35:23
110	Marty Froelick	United States	35:24
111	Cui Yulin	China	35:24
112	Barry Knight	England	35:24
113	Rebai Settouh	Algeria	35:25
114	Giuseppe Miccoli	Italy	35:25
115	Michael Gilchrist	New Zealand	35:26
116	Derek Froude	New Zealand	35:26
117	Michael Spöttel	West Germany	35:26
118	Kari Kananen	Finland	35:27
119	Garry Henry	Australia	35:27
120	Emmanuel Goulin	France	35:27
121	Helder de Jesús	Portugal	35:28
122	Shuichi Yoneshige	Japan	35:29
123	José Luis González	Spain	35:30
124	Theo van den Abeele	Belgium	35:31
125	Tom Birnie	New Zealand	35:31
126	Julian Goater	England	35:31
127	John O'Toole	Ireland	35:32
128	Joseph Otieno	Kenya	35:32
129	Spiridon Andreopoulos	Greece	35:32
130	Benedito Porto	Brazil	35:33
131	Nick Brawn	England	35:34
132	Bernhard Mosigisi	Kenya	35:35
133	Ken Moloney	New Zealand	35:35
134	Pascal Debacker	France	35:36
135	John Bolger	Canada	35:37
136	Keld Johnsen	Denmark	35:38
137	Mike Quinn	Hong Kong	35:40
138	Ralf Salzmann	West Germany	35:42
139	Cidalio Caetano	Portugal	35:42
140	Bruce Rattray	New Zealand	35:43
141	John Vermeule	Netherlands	35:43
142	Masami Otsuka	Japan	35:44
143	Ahmed Chantibou	Morocco	35:45
144	Steve Martin	Northern Ireland	
145	Neil Tennant	Scotland	
146	Abderrazak Gtari	Tunisia	
147	Gert de Rudder	Belgium	
148	Colin Hume	Scotland	
149	Mohamed Nekkachi	Morocco	
150	Gord Christie	Canada	
151	Alan Cole	Wales	
152	Roy Dooney	Ireland	
153	Chris Buckley	Wales	
154	Thomas Sørensen	Denmark	
155	Yoshitsigu Iwanga	Japan	
156	Rafael Marques	Portugal	
157	Abderrahmane Morceli	Algeria	
158	Fotios Kourtis	Greece	
159	Herbert Stephan	West Germany	
160	Lahcene Babaci	Algeria	
161	Bruno Lafranchi	Switzerland	
162	Peder Poulsen	Sweden	
163	George Braidwood	Scotland	
164	Savas Koubouras	Greece	
165	Charles Haskett	Scotland	
166	Esa Liedes	Finland	
167	Tonnie Dirks	Netherlands	
168	Henrik Sandström	Finland	
169	Nourredine Benzaoui	Algeria	
170	Mike Bishop	England	
171	Hajima Nagasato	Japan	
172	Abdellah El Hatimi	Morocco	
173	Dominique Chauvelier	France	
174	Philippe Lahuerte	Canada	
175	Neil Cusack	Ireland	
176	Tore Axelsson	Sweden	
177	Ranieri Carenza	Italy	
178	Hichem Oueslati	Tunisia	
179	Jorge Suarez	Colombia	
180	Paul Wheeler	Wales	
181	Adrie Hartveld	Netherlands	
182	Mahieddine Belhadj	Algeria	
183	Mustapha El Nechchadi	Morocco	
184	David Tavares	Portugal	
185	Hernando Hernandez	Colombia	
186	Gentil de Mello	Brazil	
187	Fethi Manai	Tunisia	
188	Lasmani Merzougui	Algeria	
189	Mike Deegan	England	
190	Philip Llewellyn	Wales	
191	Gregor Cameron	New Zealand	
192	Herman Hofstee	Netherlands	
193	Kai Jenkel	Switzerland	
194	Sisa Kirati	Kenya	
195	Marc Olesen	Canada	
196	Othmar Schoop	Switzerland	
197	Lars Bo Sørensen	Denmark	
198	Bobby Quinn	Scotland	
199	Chris Robison	England	
200	Bo Orrsveden	Sweden	
201	Ezzedine Amdouni	Tunisia	
202	Helio Aguiar	Brazil	
203	John Jenkins	Wales	
204	Deon McNeilly	Northern Ireland	
205	Ralph Petersen	Denmark	
206	Shozo Shimoju	Japan	
207	Nick de Castella	Australia	
208	Jean-Yves Berau	France	
209	Mohamed Ahmad	Palestine	
210	Adam Hoyle	Australia	
211	John Walsh	Northern Ireland	
212	Hwang Wen-Cheng	Chinese Taipei	
213	Pedro Luciano	Angola	
214	Jim Dingwall	Scotland	
215	Jaime López	Spain	
216	Konstantin Kyriazis	Greece	
217	Norman Tinkham	Canada	
218	Advaldo Neves	Brazil	
219	Feyissa Abebe	Ethiopia	
220	Paul O'Callaghan	Ireland	
221	Werner Meier	Switzerland	
222	Faycal M'hamdi	Tunisia	
223	Alvaro Palacios	Colombia	
224	Rom Tomer	Israel	
225	Paul Lawther	Northern Ireland	
226	Shayi Saad Al-Shahrani Mubarak	Saudi Arabia	
227	Gerard Barrett	Australia	
228	Mahmoud Hazzazi	Algeria	
229	Jean-Pierre Berset	Switzerland	
230	Moacir Marconi	Brazil	
231	Lucio Pereira	Portugal	
232	Osama El Sayed	Egypt	
233	Yeóryios Malliaris	Greece	
234	Palmireno Benjamin	Brazil	
235	Markus Hacksteiner	Switzerland	
236	Kurt Thor Straten	Denmark	
237	Sigurdur Sigmundsson	Iceland	
238	James Stafford	Canada	
239	Jean-Pierre de Ville	Belgium	
240	Tom Breen	Northern Ireland	
241	Raymond Curran	Northern Ireland	
242	John Christiansen	Denmark	
243	Paul Spowage	Hong Kong	
244	Panayiótis Karahalios	Greece	
245	Carlos José	Angola	
246	Mohamed Idriss	Egypt	
247	Ahmad Al-Hajry	Kuwait	
248	Jairo Cubillos Ramirez	Colombia	
249	Liu Chang-Chung	Chinese Taipei	
250	João Carvalho	Angola	
251	Ernesto José	Angola	
252	Ahmad Gharib	Kuwait	
253	Antonio Andrade	Angola	
254	John Chappory	Gibraltar	
255	Paul Stapleton	Hong Kong	
256	Hsu Gi-Sheng	Chinese Taipei	
257	Kenneth Davies	Wales	
258	Meree Al-Shahrani	Saudi Arabia	
259	Tim Soutar	Hong Kong	
260	Salem Al-Qahtani	Saudi Arabia	
261	Mouteb Al-Faouri	Jordan	
262	Andy Cullen	Gibraltar	
263	Chen Chang-Ming	Chinese Taipei	
264	Lee Yin-Sheng	Chinese Taipei	
265	Per Hoffmann	Denmark	
266	Hon Kwai Kwok	Hong Kong	
267	Francisco Silvestre	Angola	
268	Lin Hon-Long	Chinese Taipei	
269	Aurelio Falero	Gibraltar	
270	John Cunningham	Northern Ireland	
271	Ateya Al-Khashami	Saudi Arabia	
272	Mahdi Al-Qahtani	Saudi Arabia	
273	Gualter de Ceita	São Tomé and Príncipe	
274	Fahmi Abdul Wahab	North Yemen	
275	David Griffiths	Hong Kong	
276	Kao Chuan-Kuang	Chinese Taipei	
277	Aita Bdr. Limbu	Hong Kong	
278	Saleh Yacine	Palestine	
279	Keith Cawley	Hong Kong	
280	Joseph Falero	Gibraltar	
281	Saleh Darwish Ismail	Kuwait	
282	James Parody	Gibraltar	
283	Saad Al-Qahtani Kammah	Saudi Arabia	
284	Ahmed Al-Said	Palestine	
285	Wong Ip Chor	Hong Kong	
286	Mark Carreras	Gibraltar	
287	Ahmed Ali Al-Iqari	North Yemen	
288	Fabian Franco	Gibraltar	
289	Joseph Lane	Gibraltar	
290	Faisal Al-Tuwairqi	Saudi Arabia	
291	Saif Al-Shahrani	Saudi Arabia	
292	Hector Romero	Gibraltar	
293	Khaled Al-Safar	Saudi Arabia	
—	Mohammed Kedir	Ethiopia	DNF
—	Håkan Börjesson	Sweden	DNF
—	Juha Moilanen	Sweden	DNF
—	Ross Copestake	Scotland	DNF
—	Micah Boinett	Kenya	DQ^{†}

^{†}: Micah Boinett from Kenya was initially 45th in 34:43 min, but disqualified.

==== Teams ====
Rank	Team	Points
1st place, gold medalist(s)	Ethiopia: Wodajo Bulti / 3; Bekele Debele / 4; Kassa Balcha / 6; Girma Berhanu / 28; Chala Urgessa / 33; Hailu Wolde Tsadik / 55; (Adugna Lema) / (106); (Feyissa Abebe) / (219); (Mohammed Kedir) / (DNF)	129
2nd place, silver medalist(s)	Kenya: Paul Kipkoech / 2; Andrew Masai / 14; Boniface Merande / 17; Joshua Kipkemboi / 22; Jackson Ruto / 41; James Kipngetich / 45; (Joseph Otieno) / (128); (Bernhard Mosigisi) / (132); (Sisa Kirati) / (194)	141
3rd place, bronze medalist(s)	United States: Bruce Bickford / 10; Pat Porter / 12; Ed Eyestone / 16; Craig Virgin / 19; Mark Curp / 40; Jeff Drenth / 56; (Mark Stickley) / (58); (David Barney) / (76); (Marty Froelick) / (110)	153
4	Italy: Franco Boffi / 23; Gelindo Bordin / 27; Francesco Panetta / 36; Salvatore Nicosia / 39; Gianni Demadonna / 46; Marco Gozzano / 88; (Giuseppe Miccoli) / (114); (Ranieri Carenza) / (177)	259
5	Spain: Antonio Prieto / 21; Vicente Polo / 32; Pere Arco / 52; Constantino Esparcia / 53; Francisco Sánchez / 74; Abel Antón / 89; (Valentin Rodríguez) / (96); (José Luis González) / (123); (Jaime López) / (215)	321
6	Ireland: John Treacy / 5; John Woods / 29; Richard O'Flynn / 35; Ronnie Carroll / 70; Gerard Kiernan / 97; John O'Toole / 127; (Roy Dooney) / (152); (Neil Cusack) / (175); (Paul O'Callaghan) / (220)	363
7	Portugal: Carlos Lopes / 1; Fernando Mamede / 11; Antonio Leitão / 13; Fernando Couto / 83; Helder de Jesús / 121; Cidalio Caetano / 139; (Rafael Marques) / (156); (David Tavares) / (184); (Lucio Pereira) / (231)	368
8	England: Dave Lewis / 18; David Murphy / 24; Dave Clarke / 26; Barry Knight / 112; Julian Goater / 126; Nick Brawn / 131; (Mike Bishop) / (170); (Mike Deegan) / (189); (Chris Robison) / (199)	437
9	Finland: Tommy Ekblom / 25; Hannu Okkola / 64; Ari Paunonen / 66; Vesa Kähkölä / 71; Antti Loikkanen / 95; Kari Kananen / 118; (Esa Liedes) / (166); (Henrik Sandström) / (168)	439
10	Australia: Rob de Castella / 20; Garry Briggs / 43; Graham Clews / 61; Andrew Lloyd / 94; Steve Moneghetti / 102; Garry Henry / 119; (Nick de Castella) / (207); (Adam Hoyle) / (210); (Gerard Barrett) / (227)	439
11	West Germany: Christoph Herle / 7; Hans-Jürgen Orthmann / 57; Michael Scheytt / 75; Konrad Dobler / 77; Robert Schneider / 108; Michael Spöttel / 117; (Ralf Salzmann) / (138); (Herbert Stephan) / (159)	441
12	France: Pierre Levisse / 9; Jean-Louis Prianon / 34; Dominique Coux / 84; Paul Arpin / 85; Patrick Clabaut / 109; Emmanuel Goulin / 120; (Pascal Debacker) / (134); (Dominique Chauvelier) / (173); (Jean-Yves Berau) / (208)	441
13	New Zealand: Rex Wilson / 54; John Bowden / 72; Michael Gilchrist / 115; Derek Froude / 116; Tom Birnie / 125; Ken Moloney / 133; (Bruce Rattray) / (140); (Gregor Cameron) / (191)	615
14	Sweden: Lars-Erik Nilsson / 47; Mats Erixon / 69; Jan Hagelbrand / 81; Tommy Persson / 101; Peder Poulsen / 162; Tore Axelsson / 176; (Bo Orrsveden) / (200); (Håkan Börjesson) / (DNF); (Juha Moilanen) / (DNF)	636
15	Morocco: Abdellah Boubia / 62; Mohamed El Bali / 92; Larbi El Mouadden / 93; Abdelkader Kada / 103; Ahmed Chantibou / 143; Mohamed Nekkachi / 149; (Abdellah El Hatimi) / (172); (Mustapha El Nechchadi) / (183)	642
16	Brazil: José da Silva / 31; João de Sousa / 44; Eloi Schleder / 82; Benedito Porto / 130; Gentil de Mello / 186; Helio Aguiar / 202; (Advaldo Neves) / (218); (Moacir Marconi) / (230); (Palmireno Benjamin) / (234)	675
17	Canada: Paul McCloy / 73; Alain Bordeleau / 78; Carey Nelson / 86; John Bolger / 135; Gord Christie / 150; Philippe Lahuerte / 174; (Marc Olesen) / (195); (Norman Tinkham) / (217); (James Stafford) / (238)	696
18	Algeria: Abdelrazzak Bounour / 8; Miloud Djellal / 90; Rebai Settouh / 113; Abderrahmane Morceli / 157; Lahcene Babaci / 160; Nourredine Benzaoui / 169; (Mahieddine Belhadj) / (182); (Lasmani Merzougui) / (188); (Mahmoud Hazzazi) / (228)	697
19	Scotland: John Robson / 42; Nat Muir / 48; Neil Tennant / 145; Colin Hume / 148; George Braidwood / 163; Charles Haskett / 165; (Bobby Quinn) / (198); (Jim Dingwall) / (214); (Ross Copestake) / (DNF)	711
20	Belgium: Eddy de Pauw / 50; Jos Maes / 65; Jean-Pierre Paumen / 91; Theo van den Abeele / 124; Gert de Rudder / 147; Jean-Pierre de Ville / 239	716
21	Netherlands: Klaas Lok / 49; Martin ten Kate / 87; Peter Rusman / 107; John Vermeule / 141; Tonnie Dirks / 167; Adrie Hartveld / 181; (Herman Hofstee) / (192)	732
22	Japan: Satoshi Kato / 59; Michihiko Narita / 98; Shuichi Yoneshige / 122; Masami Otsuka / 142; Yoshitsigu Iwanga / 155; Hajima Nagasato / 171; (Shozo Shimoju) / (206)	747
23	Wales: Steve Jones / 37; Ieuan Ellis / 104; Alan Cole / 151; Chris Buckley / 153; Paul Wheeler / 180; Philip Llewellyn / 190; (John Jenkins) / (203); (Kenneth Davies) / (257)	815
24	Tunisia: Féthi Baccouche / 38; Habib Romdani / 80; Abderrazak Gtari / 146; Hichem Oueslati / 178; Fethi Manai / 187; Ezzedine Amdouni / 201; (Faycal M'hamdi) / (222)	830
25	Greece: Emmanuel Handzos / 68; Spiridon Andreopoulos / 129; Fotios Kourtis / 158; Savas Koubouras / 164; Konstantin Kyriazis / 216; Yeóryios Malliaris / 233; (Panayiótis Karahalios) / (244)	968
26	Switzerland: Marius Hasler / 99; Bruno Lafranchi / 161; Kai Jenkel / 193; Othmar Schoop / 196; Werner Meier / 221; Jean-Pierre Berset / 229; (Markus Hacksteiner) / (235)	1099
27	Denmark: Keld Johnsen / 136; Thomas Sørensen / 154; Lars Bo Sørensen / 197; Ralph Petersen / 205; Kurt Thor Straten / 236; John Christiansen / 242; (Per Hoffmann) / (265)	1170
28	Northern Ireland: Steve Martin / 144; Deon McNeilly / 204; John Walsh / 211; Paul Lawther / 225; Tom Breen / 240; Raymond Curran / 241; (John Cunningham) / (270)	1265
29	Hong Kong: Mike Quinn / 137; Paul Spowage / 243; Paul Stapleton / 255; Tim Soutar / 259; Hon Kwai Kwok / 266; David Griffiths / 275; (Aita Bdr. Limbu) / (277); (Keith Cawley) / (279); (Wong Ip Chor) / (285)	1435
30	Angola: Pedro Luciano / 213; Carlos José / 245; João Carvalho / 250; Ernesto José / 251; Antonio Andrade / 253; Francisco Silvestre / 267	1479
31	Chinese Taipei: Hwang Wen-Cheng / 212; Liu Chang-Chung / 249; Hsu Gi-Sheng / 256; Chen Chang-Ming / 263; Lee Yin-Sheng / 264; Lin Hon-Long / 268; (Kao Chuan-Kuang) / (276)	1512
32	Saudi Arabia: Shayi Saad Al-Shahrani Mubarak / 226; Meree Al-Shahrani / 258; Salem Al-Qahtani / 260; Ateya Al-Khashami / 271; Mahdi Al-Qahtani / 272; Saad Al-Qahtani Kammah / 283; (Faisal Al-Tuwairqi) / (290); (Saif Al-Shahrani) / (291); (Khaled Al-Safar) / (293)	1570
33	Gibraltar: John Chappory / 254; Andy Cullen / 262; Aurelio Falero / 269; Joseph Falero / 280; James Parody / 282; Mark Carreras / 286; (Fabian Franco) / (288); (Joseph Lane) / (289); (Hector Romero) / (292)	1633

- Note: Athletes in parentheses did not score for the team result

== Participation ==
An unofficial count yields the participation of 297 athletes from 47 countries in the Senior men's race, two athletes less than the official number published.

- Algeria (9)
- Angola (6)
- Australia (9)
- Belgium (6)
- Brazil (9)
- Canada (9)
- China (2)
- Chinese Taipei (7)
- Colombia (5)
- Denmark (7)
- Egypt (2)
- England (9)
- Ethiopia (9)
- Finland (8)
- France (9)
- Gibraltar (9)
- Greece (7)
- Hong Kong (9)
- Hungary (1)
- Iceland (1)
- Ireland (9)
- Israel (1)
- Italy (8)
- Japan (7)
- Jordan (1)
- Kenya (10)
- Kuwait (3)
- Morocco (8)
- Netherlands (7)
- New Zealand (8)
- Northern Ireland (7)
- North Yemen (2)
- Norway (1)
- Palestine (3)
- Portugal (9)
- São Tomé and Príncipe (1)
- Saudi Arabia (9)
- Scotland (9)
- Soviet Union (2)
- Spain (9)
- Sweden (9)
- Switzerland (7)
- Tunisia (7)
- United States (9)
- Wales (8)
- West Germany (8)
- Zimbabwe (3)

== See also ==
- 1985 IAAF World Cross Country Championships – Junior men's race
- 1985 IAAF World Cross Country Championships – Senior women's race
