= 1982 IAAF World Cross Country Championships – Senior men's race =

Senior men's race at the 1982 IAAF World Cross Country Championships
- Organisers: IAAF
- Edition: 10th
- Date: March 21
- Host city: Rome, Italy
- Venue: Ippodromo delle Capannelle
- Events: 1
- Distances: 11.978 km – Senior men
- Participation: 180 athletes from 28 nations

The Senior men's race at the 1982 IAAF World Cross Country Championships was held in Rome, Italy, at the Ippodromo delle Capannelle on March 21, 1982. A report on the event was given in the Glasgow Herald.

Complete results, medallists, and the results of British athletes were published.

== Race results ==
=== Senior men's race (11.978 km) ===
==== Individual ====
Rank	Athlete	Country	Time
1st place, gold medalist(s)	Mohammed Kedir	Ethiopia	33:40.5
2nd place, silver medalist(s)	Alberto Salazar	United States	33:44.8
3rd place, bronze medalist(s)	Rod Dixon	New Zealand	34:01.8
4	Hansjörg Kunze	East Germany	34:03
5	Mike McLeod	England	34:06.4
6	Eshetu Tura	Ethiopia	34:07.7
7	Alberto Cova	Italy	34:12.8
8	Werner Schildhauer	East Germany	34:17.1
9	Dave Clarke	England	34:19.4
10	Rob de Castella	Australia	34:20.5
11	Hugh Jones	England	34:21
12	Wodajo Bulti	Ethiopia	34:28.5
13	Fernando Mamede	Portugal	34:29.3
14	Alfred Nyasani	Kenya	34:32.7
15	Kipsubai Koskei	Kenya	34:35.1
16	Miruts Yifter	Ethiopia	34:36
17	Eric de Beck	Belgium	34:37.2
18	Julian Goater	England	34:38.1
19	Aleksandr Antipov	Soviet Union	34:39
20	Luis Adsuara	Spain	34:39.9
21	Frank Zimmermann	West Germany	34:40.7
22	Steve Kenyon	England	34:42.3
23	Steve Jones	Wales	34:45.5
24	Valeriy Sapon	Soviet Union	34:46.5
25	Hans Segerfeldt	Sweden	34:47.2
26	Gerard Kiernan	Ireland	34:47.9
27	Don Clary	United States	34:49
28	Hana Girma	Ethiopia	34:49.5
29	Hans-Jürgen Orthmann	West Germany	34:50.4
30	Allister Hutton	Scotland	34:51.4
31	José Sena	Portugal	34:52.4
32	Gerry Deegan	Ireland	34:53.7
33	Radhouane Bouster	France	34:54.1
34	Antonio Layos	Spain	34:54.3
35	Dereje Nedi	Ethiopia	34:55.2
36	John Woods	Ireland	34:56.5
37	Emiel Puttemans	Belgium	34:57.7
38	Joseph Kiptum	Kenya	34:58.9
39	Pierre Levisse	France	35:00.8
40	Santiago de la Parte	Spain	35:02
41	Vlastimil Zwiefelhofer	Czechoslovakia	35:02.3
42	Mats Erixon	Sweden	35:03.3
43	Karel Lismont	Belgium	35:03.9
44	Gianni Demadonna	Italy	35:04.6
45	Enn Sellik	Soviet Union	35:05.4
46	Viktor Chumakov	Soviet Union	35:09.2
47	John Treacy	Ireland	35:09.4
48	Some Muge	Kenya	35:09.8
49	Karl Harrison	England	35:13.6
50	Jacques Boxberger	France	35:14.2
51	Christoph Herle	West Germany	35:14.5
52	Yevgeniy Okorokov	Soviet Union	35:15.1
53	Jorge García	Spain	35:15.8
54	Constantino Esparcia	Spain	35:16.4
55	François Person	France	35:17.5
56	Ezequiel Canario	Portugal	35:18.5
57	Paul Ballinger	New Zealand	35:19.3
58	Rachid Habchaoui	Algeria	35:20.1
59	Wilson Musonik	Kenya	35:20.8
60	Daniel Dillon	United States	35:21.5
61	John McLaughlin	Northern Ireland	35:22.4
62	Eddy de Pauw	Belgium	35:23.3
63	Jan Hagelbrand	Sweden	35:23.7
64	Pat Porter	United States	35:23.9
65	Barry Knight	England	35:24.8
66	Girma Berhanu	Ethiopia	35:25.3
67	Kevin Forster	England	35:26.2
68	Michael Scheytt	West Germany	35:26.4
69	Herb Lindsay	United States	35:28.9
70	Giuseppe Gerbi	Italy	35:29.8
71	Toomas Turb	Soviet Union	35:31.8
72	Antonio Leitão	Portugal	35:35.1
73	Manfred Schoeneberg	West Germany	35:35.3
74	Boualem Rahoui	Algeria	35:36.9
75	Delfim Moreira	Portugal	35:38.1
76	Abdelrazzak Bounour	Algeria	35:39.6
77	Paul Williams	Canada	35:39.9
78	Dan Heikkinen	United States	35:40.1
79	Antonio Prieto	Spain	35:41.3
80	Allan Zachariasen	Denmark	35:41.7
81	Joaquim Pinheiro	Portugal	35:42.2
82	Alessio Faustini	Italy	35:43.2
83	Sergey Navolokin	Soviet Union	35:43.9
84	Dennis Fowles	Wales	35:47.7
85	John Robson	Scotland	35:49.3
86	Alex Gonzalez	France	35:49.6
87	Eduardo Castro	Mexico	35:50.7
88	Michael Spöttel	West Germany	35:51.7
89	Abdelmadjid Mada	Algeria	35:54.2
90	Roland Hertner	Switzerland	35:55.5
91	Giuseppe Pambianchi	Italy	35:57.9
92	Francis Gonzalez	France	35:58.8
93	Jon Sinclair	United States	35:59.1
94	Hugo Rey	Switzerland	35:59.9
95	Ron MacDonald	Scotland	36:00.9
96	Anders Carlsson	Sweden	36:01.2
97	Charles Barongo	Kenya	36:01.4
98	Adriano Musonye	Kenya	36:01.7
99	Lars-Erik Nilsson	Sweden	36:02.8
100	Kurt Huerst	Switzerland	36:03.7
101	Robert Costelloe	Ireland	36:05.2
102	Guy Arbogast	United States	36:06
103	Roger Hackney	Wales	36:06.2
104	Fredi Griner	Switzerland	36:06.5
105	Charles Kiplimo	Kenya	36:08.5
106	Keld Johnsen	Denmark	36:09
107	Neil Cusack	Ireland	36:09.8
108	Greg Duhaime	Canada	36:10
109	Léon Schots	Belgium	36:12.8
110	Rafael Marques	Portugal	36:15.1
111	Joshua Kipkemboi	Kenya	36:16
112	Eero Kinaret	Sweden	36:18.6
113	Helder de Jesús	Portugal	36:20.3
114	Igor Yefimov	Soviet Union	36:21.2
115	Arye Gamliel	Israel	36:22.5
116	Greg Hannon	Northern Ireland	36:24.2
117	Mahmoud Hazzazi	Algeria	36:26
118	Francisco Baron	Spain	36:26.9
119	Kingston Mills	Ireland	36:27.4
120	Peter Butler	Canada	36:28
121	Richard Milne	Wales	36:29.2
122	Art Boileau	Canada	36:30.4
123	Tony Blakewell	Wales	36:31
124	Peter Standing	England	36:31.3
125	Francisco Alario	Spain	36:32.2
126	Ronny Agten	Belgium	36:33.2
127	Fraser Clyne	Scotland	36:33.9
128	Padraig Keane	Ireland	36:36
129	Randy Jackson	United States	36:37.5
130	Francois Willems	Belgium	36:39.3
131	Estanislao Duran	Spain	36:41
132	Niels Kim Hjorth	Denmark	36:41.9
133	Philippe Daniel	France	36:45.6
134	Thierry Watrice	France	36:47.3
135	Alastair Douglas	Scotland	36:51.7
136	John Skovbjerg	Denmark	36:54
137	Megersa Tulu	Ethiopia	36:54.4
138	Lawrie Spence	Scotland	36:55.7
139	Peter Horisberger	Switzerland	36:56.6
140	Kenneth Davies	Wales	36:57.6
141	Tony O'Leary	Ireland	36:58
142	Alain Bordeleau	Canada	37:01.3
143	Per Hoffmann	Denmark	37:02
144	Lahcene Babaci	Algeria	37:02.6
145	Graham Clark	Scotland	37:03.5
146	Lars Bo Sørensen	Denmark	37:04.4
147	Ralph Petersen	Denmark	37:04.7
148	Edward Stewart	Scotland	37:06.1
149	Rob Lonergan	Canada	37:20.1
150	Tommy Persson	Sweden	37:22.7
151	Chris Buckley	Wales	37:25.9
152	Ieuan Ellis	Wales	37:29.8
153	Steve Martin	Northern Ireland	37:29.8
154	Rebai Settouh	Algeria	37:32.6
155	Yehuda Zadok	Israel	37:34.6
156	Rod Stone	Northern Ireland	37:35.3
157	Martin Grosskopf	West Germany	37:56.1
158	John Theophilus	Wales	38:05.4
159	Fritz Rüegsegger	Switzerland	38:14.2
160	Michael Lawther	Northern Ireland	38:22.7
161	Raymond Curran	Northern Ireland	38:35.7
162	Terry Greene	Northern Ireland	38:48.8
163	Mehdi Aidet	Algeria	38:52.8
164	Patrick Clabaut	France	39:27.6
165	Nabil Choueiry	Lebanon	39:44.6
166	Ahmed Hamadi	Kuwait	40:31.9
167	Selwan Philemone	Lebanon	45:10.9
—	El Hachami Abdenouz	Algeria	DNF
—	Vittorio Fontanella	Italy	DNF
—	Henrique Crisostomo	Portugal	DNF
—	Nat Muir	Scotland	DNF
—	Pär Wallin	Sweden	DNF
—	Roger de Vogel	Belgium	DNF
—	Bill Britton	Canada	DNF
—	Bo Orrsveden	Sweden	DNF
—	Stanislav Tabor	Czechoslovakia	DNF
—	Mike Dyon	Canada	DNF
—	Mario Gelli	Italy	DNF
—	Randy Cox	Canada	DNF
—	Sergio Pesavento	Italy	DNF

==== Teams ====
Rank	Team	Points
1st place, gold medalist(s)	Ethiopia: Mohammed Kedir / 1; Eshetu Tura / 6; Wodajo Bulti / 12; Miruts Yifter / 16; Hana Girma / 28; Dereje Nedi / 35; (Girma Berhanu) / (66); (Megersa Tulu) / (137)	98
2nd place, silver medalist(s)	England: Mike McLeod / 5; Dave Clarke / 9; Hugh Jones / 11; Julian Goater / 18; Steve Kenyon / 22; Karl Harrison / 49; (Barry Knight) / (65); (Kevin Forster) / (67); (Peter Standing) / (124)	114
3rd place, bronze medalist(s)	Soviet Union: Aleksandr Antipov / 19; Valeriy Sapon / 24; Enn Sellik / 45; Viktor Chumakov / 46; Yevgeniy Okorokov / 52; Toomas Turb / 71; (Sergey Navolokin) / (83); (Igor Yefimov) / (114)	257
4	Kenya: Alfred Nyasani / 14; Kipsubai Koskei / 15; Joseph Kiptum / 38; Some Muge / 48; Wilson Musonik / 59; Charles Barongo / 97; (Adriano Musonye) / (98); (Charles Kiplimo) / (105); (Joshua Kipkemboi) / (111)	271
5	Spain: Luis Adsuara / 20; Antonio Layos / 34; Santiago de la Parte / 40; Jorge García / 53; Constantino Esparcia / 54; Antonio Prieto / 79; (Francisco Baron) / (118); (Francisco Alario) / (125); (Estanislao Duran) / (131)	280
6	United States: Alberto Salazar / 2; Don Clary / 27; Daniel Dillon / 60; Pat Porter / 64; Herb Lindsay / 69; Dan Heikkinen / 78; (Jon Sinclair) / (93); (Guy Arbogast) / (102); (Randy Jackson) / (129)	300
7	Portugal: Fernando Mamede / 13; José Sena / 31; Ezequiel Canario / 56; Antonio Leitão / 72; Delfim Moreira / 75; Joaquim Pinheiro / 81; (Rafael Marques) / (110); (Helder de Jesús) / (113); (Henrique Crisostomo) / (DNF)	328
8	West Germany: Frank Zimmermann / 21; Hans-Jürgen Orthmann / 29; Christoph Herle / 51; Michael Scheytt / 68; Manfred Schoeneberg / 73; Michael Spöttel / 88; (Martin Grosskopf) / (157)	330
9	Ireland: Gerard Kiernan / 26; Gerry Deegan / 32; John Woods / 36; John Treacy / 47; Robert Costelloe / 101; Neil Cusack / 107; (Kingston Mills) / (119); (Padraig Keane) / (128); (Tony O'Leary) / (141)	349
10	France: Radhouane Bouster / 33; Pierre Levisse / 39; Jacques Boxberger / 50; François Person / 55; Alex Gonzalez / 86; Francis Gonzalez / 92; (Philippe Daniel) / (133); (Thierry Watrice) / (134); (Patrick Clabaut) / (164)	355
11	Belgium: Eric de Beck / 17; Emiel Puttemans / 37; Karel Lismont / 43; Eddy de Pauw / 62; Léon Schots / 109; Ronny Agten / 126; (Francois Willems) / (130); (Roger de Vogel) / (DNF)	394
12	Sweden: Hans Segerfeldt / 25; Mats Erixon / 42; Jan Hagelbrand / 63; Anders Carlsson / 96; Lars-Erik Nilsson / 99; Eero Kinaret / 112; (Tommy Persson) / (150); (Pär Wallin) / (DNF); (Bo Orrsveden) / (DNF)	437
13	Algeria: Rachid Habchaoui / 58; Boualem Rahoui / 74; Abdelrazzak Bounour / 76; Abdelmadjid Mada / 89; Mahmoud Hazzazi / 117; Lahcene Babaci / 144; (Rebai Settouh) / (154); (Mehdi Aidet) / (163); (El Hachami Abdenouz) / (DNF)	558
14	Wales: Steve Jones / 23; Dennis Fowles / 84; Roger Hackney / 103; Richard Milne / 121; Tony Blakewell / 123; Kenneth Davies / 140; (Chris Buckley) / (151); (Ieuan Ellis) / (152); (John Theophilus) / (158)	594
15	Scotland: Allister Hutton / 30; John Robson / 85; Ron MacDonald / 95; Fraser Clyne / 127; Alastair Douglas / 135; Lawrie Spence / 138; (Graham Clark) / (145); (Edward Stewart) / (148); (Nat Muir) / (DNF)	610
16	Switzerland: Roland Hertner / 90; Hugo Rey / 94; Kurt Huerst / 100; Fredi Griner / 104; Peter Horisberger / 139; Fritz Rüegsegger / 159	686
17	Canada: Paul Williams / 77; Greg Duhaime / 108; Peter Butler / 120; Art Boileau / 122; Alain Bordeleau / 142; Rob Lonergan / 149; (Bill Britton) / (DNF); (Mike Dyon) / (DNF); (Randy Cox) / (DNF)	718
18	Denmark: Allan Zachariasen / 80; Keld Johnsen / 106; Niels Kim Hjorth / 132; John Skovbjerg / 136; Per Hoffmann / 143; Lars Bo Sørensen / 146; (Ralph Petersen) / (147)	743
19	Northern Ireland: John McLaughlin / 61; Greg Hannon / 116; Steve Martin / 153; Rod Stone / 156; Michael Lawther / 160; Raymond Curran / 161; (Terry Greene) / (162)	807
DNF	Italy: (Alberto Cova) / (7); (Gianni Demadonna) / (44); (Giuseppe Gerbi) / (70); (Alessio Faustini) / (82); (Giuseppe Pambianchi) / (91); (Vittorio Fontanella) / (DNF); (Mario Gelli) / (DNF); (Sergio Pesavento) / (DNF)	DNF

- Note: Athletes in parentheses did not score for the team result

== Participation ==
An unofficial count yields the participation of 180 athletes from 28 countries in the Senior men's race. This is in agreement with the official numbers as published.

- Algeria (9)
- Australia (1)
- Belgium (8)
- Canada (9)
- Czechoslovakia (2)
- Denmark (7)
- East Germany (2)
- England (9)
- Ethiopia (8)
- France (9)
- Ireland (9)
- Israel (2)
- Italy (8)
- Kenya (9)
- Kuwait (1)
- Lebanon (2)
- Mexico (1)
- New Zealand (2)
- Northern Ireland (7)
- Portugal (9)
- Scotland (9)
- Soviet Union (8)
- Spain (9)
- Sweden (9)
- Switzerland (6)
- United States (9)
- Wales (9)
- West Germany (7)

== See also ==
- 1982 IAAF World Cross Country Championships – Junior men's race
- 1982 IAAF World Cross Country Championships – Senior women's race
