= 1983 IAAF World Cross Country Championships – Senior men's race =

Senior men's race at the 1983 IAAF World Cross Country Championships
- Organisers: IAAF
- Edition: 11th
- Date: March 20
- Host city: Gateshead, Tyne and Wear, England
- Venue: Riverside Park
- Events: 1
- Distances: 11.994 km – Senior men
- Participation: 213 athletes from 31 nations

The Senior men's race at the 1983 IAAF World Cross Country Championships was held in Gateshead, England, at the Riverside Park on March 20, 1983. A report on the event was given in the Glasgow Herald and in the Evening Times.

Complete results, medallists, and the results of British athletes were published.

== Race results ==
=== Senior men's race (11.994 km) ===
==== Individual ====
Rank	Athlete	Country	Time
1st place, gold medalist(s)	Bekele Debele	Ethiopia	36:52
2nd place, silver medalist(s)	Carlos Lopes	Portugal	36:52
3rd place, bronze medalist(s)	Some Muge	Kenya	36:52
4	Alberto Salazar	United States	36:53
5	Antonio Prieto	Spain	36:56
6	Rob de Castella	Australia	37:00
7	Dave Clarke	England	37:05
8	Ezequiel Canario	Portugal	37:10
9	Pat Porter	United States	37:12
10	Alberto Cova	Italy	37:17
11	Nat Muir	Scotland	37:24
12	Mehmet Yürdadön	Turkey	37:24
13	Pierre Levisse	France	37:24
14	Eshetu Tura	Ethiopia	37:28
15	Constantino Esparcia	Spain	37:29
16	Paul Kipkoech	Kenya	37:32
17	Eric de Beck	Belgium	37:34
18	Hans-Jürgen Orthmann	West Germany	37:35
19	Steve Jones	Wales	37:35
20	Wodajo Bulti	Ethiopia	37:35
21	John Andrews	Australia	37:36
22	Mohammed Kedir	Ethiopia	37:37
23	Adugna Lema	Ethiopia	37:38
24	Chala Urgessa	Ethiopia	37:39
25	Jan Hagelbrand	Sweden	37:44
26	Gelindo Bordin	Italy	37:45
27	Paul Ballinger	New Zealand	37:45
28	Thom Hunt	United States	37:46
29	Gerard Kiernan	Ireland	37:47
30	Ed Eyestone	United States	37:48
31	Joshua Kipkemboi	Kenya	37:49
32	James Kipngetich	Kenya	37:50
33	Kevin Forster	England	37:52
34	Lawrie Whitty	Australia	37:52
35	Jorge García	Spain	37:53
36	Luis Adsuara	Spain	37:58
37	Jackson Ruto	Kenya	37:59
38	Boualem Rahoui	Algeria	38:02
39	Brian Lewry	Australia	38:03
40	Niels Kim Hjorth	Denmark	38:04
41	Christoph Herle	West Germany	38:06
42	Craig Virgin	United States	38:06
43	Dave Taylor	Ireland	38:09
44	Antonio Layos	Spain	38:09
45	Robert McDonald	Australia	38:10
46	Karel Lismont	Belgium	38:10
47	Tom Birnie	New Zealand	38:12
48	Maxwell Little	Australia	38:12
49	Michael Spöttel	West Germany	38:13
50	Dejene Beyene	Ethiopia	38:17
51	Helder de Jesús	Portugal	38:18
52	Michael Scheytt	West Germany	38:19
53	Dave Lewis	England	38:19
54	Rex Wilson	New Zealand	38:21
55	Alain Bordeleau	Canada	38:24
56	Jacques Boxberger	France	38:25
57	Mark Anderson	United States	38:25
58	Girma Berhanu	Ethiopia	38:26
59	Ahmed Salah	Djibouti	38:28
60	Alex Hagelsteens	Belgium	38:29
61	Gianni Demadonna	Italy	38:30
62	Gerry Deegan	Ireland	38:30
63	Vincent Rousseau	Belgium	38:32
64	Antonio Leitão	Portugal	38:34
65	Venanzio Ortis	Italy	38:35
66	Steven Harris	England	38:36
67	Miruts Yifter	Ethiopia	38:37
68	Paul McCloy	Canada	38:37
69	Francesco Panetta	Italy	38:37
70	Karl Harrison	England	38:37
71	Angel Gómez Maeso	Spain	38:38
72	Herman Kipngetich	Kenya	38:40
73	Hans Segerfeldt	Sweden	38:40
74	Ralf Salzmann	West Germany	38:40
75	Franco Boffi	Italy	38:42
76	Pascal Debacker	France	38:43
77	Christian Geffray	France	38:45
78	Féthi Baccouche	Tunisia	38:46
79	Pär Wallin	Sweden	38:48
80	Thierry Watrice	France	38:49
81	Adam Hoyle	Australia	38:49
82	Mats Erixon	Sweden	38:50
83	Sisa Kirati	Kenya	38:50
84	Rafael Marques	Portugal	38:50
85	Keld Johnsen	Denmark	38:53
86	Julio Perez	Spain	38:53
87	Ronny Agten	Belgium	38:55
88	Gerhard Krippner	West Germany	38:55
89	Tony Milovsorov	England	38:55
90	Michel Lelut	France	38:56
91	Dominic Wambua	Kenya	38:57
92	Marti ten Kate	Netherlands	39:00
93	Fernando Miguel	Portugal	39:02
94	Raymond Paulins	Canada	39:03
95	Phil O'Brien	England	39:06
96	John Woods	Ireland	39:06
97	Fraser Clyne	Scotland	39:07
98	Ross Chilton	Canada	39:08
99	Yngvar Christiansen	Norway	39:10
100	Francois Willems	Belgium	39:11
101	Bob Treadwell	England	39:12
102	Roy Dooney	Ireland	39:12
103	José Sena	Portugal	39:15
104	Mohammed Chouri	Tunisia	39:15
105	Bo Orrsveden	Sweden	39:17
106	El Hachami Abdenouz	Algeria	39:19
107	Piet van de Haas	Netherlands	39:20
108	Aissa Taleb	Algeria	39:20
109	Nick de Castella	Australia	39:20
110	Brendan Quinn	Ireland	39:21
111	Zhang Guowei	China	39:22
112	Hugo Rey	Switzerland	39:23
113	Øyvind Dahl	Norway	39:24
114	Paul Alle	France	39:24
115	Santiago de la Parte	Spain	39:24
116	Ranieri Carenza	Italy	39:24
117	Peter Rusman	Netherlands	39:26
118	Doug Brown	United States	39:27
119	Tony Blakewell	Wales	39:27
120	Ahmet Altun	Turkey	39:28
121	Adrian Shorter	Canada	39:28
122	Douglas Frame	Scotland	39:29
123	Marius Hasler	Switzerland	39:29
124	Eirik Berge	Norway	39:29
125	David James	Wales	39:29
126	Derek Froude	New Zealand	39:29
127	Tore Sagvolden	Norway	39:32
128	Martin Couldwell	New Zealand	39:33
129	Robert Costelloe	Ireland	39:34
130	Jean-Louis Prianon	France	39:34
131	Djama Robleh	Djibouti	39:36
132	Gary Palmer	New Zealand	39:36
133	Göran Högberg	Sweden	39:36
134	Rachid Habchaoui	Algeria	39:36
135	Martín Fiz	Spain	39:38
136	Reinhard Leibold	West Germany	39:39
137	Werner Mory	Belgium	39:39
138	Fredi Griner	Switzerland	39:39
139	Joseph Otieno	Kenya	39:40
140	Abdelrazzak Bounour	Algeria	39:41
141	Jan Fjärestad	Norway	39:42
142	Zeki Atli	Turkey	39:43
143	Donald Greig	New Zealand	39:45
144	Shane Marshall	New Zealand	39:49
145	Nigel Adams	Wales	39:50
146	Abdelkader Boughrara	Algeria	39:53
147	Bill Donakowski	United States	39:54
148	Klaas Lok	Netherlands	39:55
149	Tommy Persson	Sweden	39:55
150	Michele Cinà	Italy	39:57
151	Henrik Albahn	Denmark	39:57
152	Miao Yunshen	China	39:57
153	Adelaziz Bouguerra	Tunisia	39:58
154	Terry Greene	Northern Ireland	39:58
155	Euan Robertson	New Zealand	40:00
156	Chris Buckley	Wales	40:01
157	Fernando Couto	Portugal	40:03
158	Sefa Het	Turkey	40:03
159	Terence Mitchell	Scotland	40:03
160	John Idstrom	United States	40:05
161	Bruno Lafranchi	Switzerland	40:06
162	Kenneth Davies	Wales	40:09
163	Oddmund Roalkvam	Norway	40:11
164	Joost Borm	Netherlands	40:12
165	Hwang Wen-Cheng	Chinese Taipei	40:13
166	Hichem Oueslati	Tunisia	40:13
167	Hans Nilsson	Sweden	40:14
168	Henk Mentink	Netherlands	40:15
169	Noel Harvey	Ireland	40:17
170	Rod Stone	Northern Ireland	40:17
171	Joël Lucas	France	40:19
172	Paul Wheeler	Wales	40:20
173	Tonni Luttikhold	Netherlands	40:22
174	Jiang Wenqing	China	40:22
175	Peter McColgan	Northern Ireland	40:22
176	Ole Hansen	Denmark	40:24
177	Ieuan Ellis	Wales	40:26
178	Chen Xinshun	China	40:27
179	Abderrahmane Morceli	Algeria	40:28
180	Jim Dingwall	Scotland	40:29
181	Omar Cochine	Djibouti	40:32
182	Graham Crawford	Scotland	40:36
183	Abderrazak Gtari	Tunisia	40:38
184	Song Tianzhi	China	40:39
185	Roland Hertner	Switzerland	40:39
186	Roger Cawkwell	Canada	40:42
187	John Theophilus	Wales	40:48
188	Steve Martin	Northern Ireland	40:56
189	Ali Chehidi	Tunisia	40:58
190	Xue Jianjun	China	40:59
191	Hanefi Atmaca	Turkey	40:59
192	Philippe Lahuerte	Canada	41:00
193	Lawrie Spence	Scotland	41:02
194	Cameron Spence	Northern Ireland	41:02
195	Christian Cote	Canada	41:09
196	Arye Gamliel	Israel	41:10
197	Raymond van Paemel	Belgium	41:22
198	Evan Cameron	Scotland	41:26
199	Werner Meier	Switzerland	41:30
200	Robert de Brouwer	Netherlands	41:39
201	George Braidwood	Scotland	41:44
202	Eddie Oxlade	Northern Ireland	41:45
203	Brahim Boudina	Algeria	41:55
204	Yair Karni	Israel	42:11
205	Ernie Cunningham	Northern Ireland	42:12
206	Abdelhadi Boudjenane	Algeria	42:50
207	James Ross	Northern Ireland	43:06
208	Liang Yen-Lin	Chinese Taipei	43:08
209	Mubarak Abdel Majeed	Kuwait	47:02
210	Saïd Attoumane	Comoros	48:12
—	Dan Glans	Sweden	DNF
—	Fernando Mamede	Portugal	DNF
—	John Treacy	Ireland	DNF

==== Teams ====
Rank	Team	Points
1st place, gold medalist(s)	Ethiopia: Bekele Debele / 1; Eshetu Tura / 14; Wodajo Bulti / 20; Mohammed Kedir / 22; Adugna Lema / 23; Chala Urgessa / 24; (Dejene Beyene) / (50); (Girma Berhanu) / (58); (Miruts Yifter) / (67)	104
2nd place, silver medalist(s)	United States: Alberto Salazar / 4; Pat Porter / 9; Thom Hunt / 28; Ed Eyestone / 30; Craig Virgin / 42; Mark Anderson / 57; (Doug Brown) / (118); (Bill Donakowski) / (147); (John Idstrom) / (160)	170
3rd place, bronze medalist(s)	Kenya: Some Muge / 3; Paul Kipkoech / 16; Joshua Kipkemboi / 31; James Kipngetich / 32; Jackson Ruto / 37; Herman Kipngetich / 72; (Sisa Kirati) / (83); (Dominic Wambua) / (91); (Joseph Otieno) / (139)	191
4	Australia: Rob de Castella / 6; John Andrews / 21; Lawrie Whitty / 34; Brian Lewry / 39; Robert McDonald / 45; Maxwell Little / 48; (Adam Hoyle) / (81); (Nick de Castella) / (109)	193
5	Spain: Antonio Prieto / 5; Constantino Esparcia / 15; Jorge García / 35; Luis Adsuara / 36; Antonio Layos / 44; Angel Gómez Maeso / 71; (Julio Perez) / (86); (Santiago de la Parte) / (115); (Martín Fiz) / (135)	206
6	Portugal: Carlos Lopes / 2; Ezequiel Canario / 8; Helder de Jesús / 51; Antonio Leitão / 64; Rafael Marques / 84; Fernando Miguel / 93; (José Sena) / (103); (Fernando Couto) / (157); (Fernando Mamede) / (DNF)	302
7	Italy: Alberto Cova / 10; Gelindo Bordin / 26; Gianni Demadonna / 61; Venanzio Ortis / 65; Francesco Panetta / 69; Franco Boffi / 75; (Ranieri Carenza) / (116); (Michele Cinà) / (150)	306
8	England: Dave Clarke / 7; Kevin Forster / 33; Dave Lewis / 53; Steven Harris / 66; Karl Harrison / 70; Tony Milovsorov / 89; (Phil O'Brien) / (95); (Bob Treadwell) / (101)	318
9	West Germany: Hans-Jürgen Orthmann / 18; Christoph Herle / 41; Michael Spöttel / 49; Michael Scheytt / 52; Ralf Salzmann / 74; Gerhard Krippner / 88; (Reinhard Leibold) / (136)	322
10	Belgium: Eric de Beck / 17; Karel Lismont / 46; Alex Hagelsteens / 60; Vincent Rousseau / 63; Ronny Agten / 87; Francois Willems / 100; (Werner Mory) / (137); (Raymond van Paemel) / (197)	373
11	France: Pierre Levisse / 13; Jacques Boxberger / 56; Pascal Debacker / 76; Christian Geffray / 77; Thierry Watrice / 80; Michel Lelut / 90; (Paul Alle) / (114); (Jean-Louis Prianon) / (130); (Joël Lucas) / (171)	392
12	Ireland: Gerard Kiernan / 29; Dave Taylor / 43; Gerry Deegan / 62; John Woods / 96; Roy Dooney / 102; Brendan Quinn / 110; (Robert Costelloe) / (129); (Noel Harvey) / (169); (John Treacy) / (DNF)	442
13	Sweden: Jan Hagelbrand / 25; Hans Segerfeldt / 73; Pär Wallin / 79; Mats Erixon / 82; Bo Orrsveden / 105; Göran Högberg / 133; (Tommy Persson) / (149); (Hans Nilsson) / (167); (Dan Glans) / (DNF)	497
14	New Zealand: Paul Ballinger / 27; Tom Birnie / 47; Rex Wilson / 54; Derek Froude / 126; Martin Couldwell / 128; Gary Palmer / 132; (Donald Greig) / (143); (Shane Marshall) / (144); (Euan Robertson) / (155)	514
15	Canada: Alain Bordeleau / 55; Paul McCloy / 68; Raymond Paulins / 94; Ross Chilton / 98; Adrian Shorter / 121; Roger Cawkwell / 186; (Philippe Lahuerte) / (192); (Christian Cote) / (195)	622
16	Algeria: Boualem Rahoui / 38; El Hachami Abdenouz / 106; Aissa Taleb / 108; Rachid Habchaoui / 134; Abdelrazzak Bounour / 140; Abdelkader Boughrara / 146; (Abderrahmane Morceli) / (179); (Brahim Boudina) / (203); (Abdelhadi Boudjenane) / (206)	672
17	Wales: Steve Jones / 19; Tony Blakewell / 119; David James / 125; Nigel Adams / 145; Chris Buckley / 156; Kenneth Davies / 162; (Paul Wheeler) / (172); (Ieuan Ellis) / (177); (John Theophilus) / (187)	726
18	Scotland: Nat Muir / 11; Fraser Clyne / 97; Douglas Frame / 122; Terence Mitchell / 159; Jim Dingwall / 180; Graham Crawford / 182; (Lawrie Spence) / (193); (Evan Cameron) / (198); (George Braidwood) / (201)	751
19	Norway: Yngvar Christiansen / 99; Øyvind Dahl / 113; Eirik Berge / 124; Tore Sagvolden / 127; Jan Fjärestad / 141; Oddmund Roalkvam / 163	767
20	Netherlands: Martin ten Kate / 92; Piet van de Haas / 107; Peter Rusman / 117; Klaas Lok / 148; Joost Borm / 164; Henk Mentink / 168; (Tonni Luttikhold) / (173); (Robert de Brouwer) / (200)	796
21	Tunisia: Féthi Baccouche / 78; Mohammed Chouri / 104; Adelaziz Bouguerra / 153; Hichem Oueslati / 166; Abderrazak Gtari / 183; Ali Chehidi / 189	873
22	Switzerland: Hugo Rey / 112; Marius Hasler / 123; Fredi Griner / 138; Bruno Lafranchi / 161; Roland Hertner / 185; Werner Meier / 199	918
23	China: Zhang Guowei / 111; Miao Yunshen / 152; Jiang Wenqing / 174; Chen Xinshun / 178; Song Tianzhi / 184; Xue Jianjun / 190	989
24	Northern Ireland: Terry Greene / 154; Rod Stone / 170; Peter McColgan / 175; Steve Martin / 188; Cameron Spence / 194; Eddie Oxlade / 202; (Ernie Cunningham) / (205); (James Ross) / (207)	1083

- Note: Athletes in parentheses did not score for the team result

== Participation ==
An unofficial count yields the participation of 213 athletes from 31 countries in the senior men's race, one athlete less than the official number published.

- Algeria (9)
- Australia (8)
- Belgium (8)
- Canada (8)
- China (6)
- Chinese Taipei (2)
- Comoros (1)
- Denmark (4)
- Djibouti (3)
- England (8)
- Ethiopia (9)
- France (9)
- Ireland (9)
- Israel (2)
- Italy (8)
- Kenya (9)
- Kuwait (1)
- Netherlands (8)
- New Zealand (9)
- Northern Ireland (8)
- Norway (6)
- Portugal (9)
- Scotland (9)
- Spain (9)
- Sweden (9)
- Switzerland (6)
- Tunisia (6)
- Turkey (5)
- United States (9)
- Wales (9)
- West Germany (7)

== See also ==
- 1983 IAAF World Cross Country Championships – Junior men's race
- 1983 IAAF World Cross Country Championships – Senior women's race
