= 1984 IAAF World Cross Country Championships – Senior men's race =

Senior men's race at the 1984 IAAF World Cross Country Championships
- Organisers: IAAF
- Edition: 12th
- Date: March 25
- Host city: East Rutherford, New Jersey, United States
- Venue: Meadowlands Racetrack
- Events: 1
- Distances: 12.086 km – Senior men
- Participation: 240 athletes from 37 nations

The Senior men's race at the 1984 IAAF World Cross Country Championships was held in East Rutherford, New Jersey, United States, at the Meadowlands Racetrack on March 25, 1984. A report on the event was given in the Glasgow Herald.

Complete results, medallists, and the results of British athletes were published.

== Race results ==
=== Senior men's race (12.086 km) ===
==== Individual ====
Rank	Athlete	Country	Time
1st place, gold medalist(s)	Carlos Lopes	Portugal	33:25
2nd place, silver medalist(s)	Tim Hutchings	England	33:30
3rd place, bronze medalist(s)	Steve Jones	Wales	33:32
4	Pat Porter	United States	33:34
5	Wilson Waigwa	Kenya	33:41
6	Ed Eyestone	United States	33:46
7	Pierre Levisse	France	33:51
8	Bekele Debele	Ethiopia	33:52
9	Adugna Lema	Ethiopia	33:52
10	Francesco Panetta	Italy	33:54
11	Alberto Cova	Italy	33:58
12	Christoph Herle	West Germany	34:01
13	John Treacy	Ireland	34:01
14	Niels Kim Hjorth	Denmark	34:03
15	Martti Vainio	Finland	34:04
16	Mohammed Kedir	Ethiopia	34:06
17	Craig Virgin	United States	34:07
18	Stijn Jaspers	Netherlands	34:07
19	Paul Kipkoech	Kenya	34:07
20	Rex Wilson	New Zealand	34:07
21	Rob de Castella	Australia	34:08
22	Luis Adsuara	Spain	34:08
23	Fernando Mamede	Portugal	34:09
24	Dereje Nedi	Ethiopia	34:09
25	Antonio Leitão	Portugal	34:12
26	João Campos	Portugal	34:13
27	Jorge García	Spain	34:13
28	John Easker	United States	34:15
29	Eduardo Castro	Mexico	34:17
30	Julian Goater	England	34:19
31	Eshetu Tura	Ethiopia	34:19
32	Constantino Esparcia	Spain	34:20
33	John Bowden	New Zealand	34:21
34	Kevin Forster	England	34:23
35	John Woods	Ireland	34:24
36	Dominique Chauvelier	France	34:25
37	Gerardo Alcala	Mexico	34:25
38	David Burridge	New Zealand	34:26
39	Joshua Kipkemboi	Kenya	34:27
40	Klaas Lok	Netherlands	34:28
41	Jeff Drenth	United States	34:29
42	Paul McCloy	Canada	34:29
43	Zhang Guowei	China	34:32
44	Shane Marshall	New Zealand	34:33
45	Hans-Jürgen Orthmann	West Germany	34:34
46	Wodajo Bulti	Ethiopia	34:35
47	Shozo Shimoju	Japan	34:36
48	Alain Bordeleau	Canada	34:37
49	Peter Tootell	England	34:38
50	Vicente Polo	Spain	34:38
51	Philippe Legrand	France	34:39
52	Some Muge	Kenya	34:39
53	Frank Zimmermann	West Germany	34:40
54	Stefano Mei	Italy	34:40
55	Franco Boffi	Italy	34:40
56	Michael Scheytt	West Germany	34:41
57	Omwanda Mirande	Kenya	34:41
58	Santiago Llorente	Spain	34:41
59	Theo van den Abeele	Belgium	34:42
60	Giuseppe Pambianchi	Italy	34:42
61	Peter Kianga	Kenya	34:42
62	Karel Lismont	Belgium	34:43
63	Joseph Kiptum	Kenya	34:43
64	Ezequiel Canario	Portugal	34:44
65	Mark Stickley	United States	34:45
66	John O'Toole	Ireland	34:46
67	Richard O'Flynn	Ireland	34:47
68	Salvatore Antibo	Italy	34:48
69	Andy Holden	England	34:50
70	Tom Birnie	New Zealand	34:51
71	Dallas McCallum	New Zealand	34:52
72	Andrew Masai	Kenya	34:52
73	Jef Gees	Belgium	34:53
74	Jan Hagelbrand	Sweden	34:54
75	Shuichi Yoneshige	Japan	34:55
76	Lars-Erik Nilsson	Sweden	34:55
77	Jean-Louis Prianon	France	34:56
78	Henrik Sandström	Finland	34:56
79	Werner Mory	Belgium	34:57
80	Ranieri Carenza	Italy	34:57
81	Antonio Prieto	Spain	34:58
82	Marco Gozzano	Italy	34:59
83	Jesús Herrera	Mexico	34:59
84	Joaquim Pinheiro	Portugal	35:00
85	Richard Partridge	England	35:01
86	Jairo Correa	Colombia	35:01
87	Geoff Turnbull	England	35:02
88	Cándido Alario	Spain	35:02
89	Mats Erixon	Sweden	35:03
90	Alex Gonzalez	France	35:04
91	Ghilsmain Fourrier	Belgium	35:05
92	John Idstrom	United States	35:08
93	Valentin Rodríguez	Spain	35:10
94	Daniel Dillon	United States	35:10
95	Jean-Pierre Paumen	Belgium	35:11
96	Feyissa Abebe	Ethiopia	35:12
97	Hailu Wolde Tsadik	Ethiopia	35:12
98	Tonnie Dirks	Netherlands	35:12
99	Toshihiro Shibutani	Japan	35:13
100	Keld Johnsen	Denmark	35:13
101	Tommy Persson	Sweden	35:14
102	Robert Costelloe	Ireland	35:15
103	Paul Ballinger	New Zealand	35:15
104	Jos Maes	Belgium	35:15
105	Tony O'Leary	Ireland	35:16
106	Joaquin Leano	Colombia	35:17
107	Ron Becht	Canada	35:17
108	Kenneth Davies	Wales	35:19
109	Hans Koeleman	Netherlands	35:19
110	Jacques Boxberger	France	35:20
111	Raymond van Paemel	Belgium	35:21
112	Lawrie Spence	Scotland	35:22
113	Steve Binns	England	35:23
114	Konrad Dobler	West Germany	35:24
115	Domingo Tibaduiza	Colombia	35:25
116	Pär Wallin	Sweden	35:27
117	Didier Bernard	France	35:29
118	Deon McNeilly	Northern Ireland	35:30
119	Andrew Evans	Wales	35:30
120	José Manuel Albentosa	Spain	35:31
121	Kurt Huerst	Switzerland	35:31
122	Robert Schneider	West Germany	35:31
123	Hillary Tuwei	Kenya	35:31
124	Fernando Couto	Portugal	35:33
125	Robert Cook	Canada	35:34
126	Nigel Adams	Wales	35:37
127	Gábor Szabó	Hungary	35:38
128	Bernd Rangen	West Germany	35:39
129	Jari Nurmisto	Finland	35:39
130	Marti ten Kate	Netherlands	35:40
131	Ross Copestake	Scotland	35:42
132	Tony Blakewell	Wales	35:43
133	Roland Hertner	Switzerland	35:43
134	Marc Borghans	Netherlands	35:43
135	Lars Ericsson	Sweden	35:44
136	Beat Steffen	Switzerland	35:44
137	Lars Bo Sørensen	Denmark	35:45
138	Hans Segerfeldt	Sweden	35:45
139	Pascal Debacker	France	35:47
140	Marius Hasler	Switzerland	35:48
141	Roy Dooney	Ireland	35:48
142	Martin Schmid	Switzerland	35:49
143	Edward Stewart	Scotland	35:49
144	Troy Billings	United States	35:51
145	Derek Froude	New Zealand	35:51
146	Terence Mitchell	Scotland	35:53
147	Sabag Shemtov	Israel	35:55
148	Terry Greene	Northern Ireland	35:57
149	Fraser Clyne	Scotland	35:58
150	Thierry Watrice	France	35:59
151	Steve Martin	Northern Ireland	36:00
152	Roger de Vogel	Belgium	36:01
153	Roberto Silva	Mexico	36:02
154	Wu Zhihan	China	36:02
155	Adrian Shorter	Canada	36:02
156	Cui Yulin	China	36:03
157	Henrik Albahn	Denmark	36:05
158	Eddie Herridge	England	36:06
159	Ralph Petersen	Denmark	36:07
160	Cong Ming	China	36:09
161	Dan Glans	Sweden	36:09
162	Kingston Mills	Ireland	36:11
163	Megersa Tulu	Ethiopia	36:12
164	Per Hoffmann	Denmark	36:14
165	Raul Ceja	Mexico	36:15
166	Cor Lambregts	Netherlands	36:17
167	Chris Buckley	Wales	36:18
168	Alex Gilmour	Scotland	36:20
169	Tony Simmons	Wales	36:22
170	James Egan	Scotland	36:26
171	Ieuan Ellis	Wales	36:29
172	Nestor Moreno	Puerto Rico	36:30
173	Christian Wolfsberg	Denmark	36:31
174	Fu Bangrong	China	36:31
175	Charles Haskett	Scotland	36:33
176	Cameron Spence	Northern Ireland	36:35
177	Masahito Ueda	Japan	36:36
178	Hugo Rey	Switzerland	36:42
179	Samuel Doherty	Northern Ireland	36:45
180	Randy Cox	Canada	36:50
181	Ilpo Jousimaa	Finland	36:51
182	Rheal Desjardins	Canada	36:53
183	Yang Lin	China	36:54
184	Mohamed Bekheet	Palestine	36:57
185	Sadot Méndez	Puerto Rico	36:58
186	Eddie Oxlade	Northern Ireland	37:00
187	Roberto Ramos	Puerto Rico	37:02
188	Derick Adamson	Jamaica	37:06
189	Martin Grüning	West Germany	37:09
190	Jón Didriksson	Iceland	37:12
191	Ildelgard Vargas	Venezuela	37:14
192	Gábor Markó	Hungary	37:17
193	Alun Roper	Wales	37:18
194	Michael Feurtado	Jamaica	37:19
195	Joseph Cross	Jamaica	37:23
196	Takuya Hashiba	Japan	37:25
197	Israel Díaz	Puerto Rico	37:27
198	Sigurdur Sigmundsson	Iceland	37:31
199	Fernando Miguel	Portugal	37:35
200	Ahmad Al-Hajry	Kuwait	37:35
201	John Arnold	Hong Kong	37:38
202	Cesar Sabagol	Colombia	37:39
203	Placido Martin	Colombia	37:41
204	Paul Stapleton	Hong Kong	37:44
205	João Silva	Portugal	37:45
206	Alvaro Palacios	Colombia	37:46
207	Pablo Rodríguez	Puerto Rico	37:55
208	Cebert Cooper	Jamaica	38:02
209	Luis Almonte	Dominican Republic	38:02
210	Tim Soutar	Hong Kong	38:11
211	Saleh Haji Ali	Kuwait	38:12
212	Jens Hansen	Denmark	38:16
213	Jukka Viitasaari	Finland	38:22
214	Francisco Medina	Mexico	38:24
215	Agust Thorsteinsson	Iceland	38:26
216	Fredeberto Sanchez	Mexico	38:26
217	Jorge Alvarado	Puerto Rico	38:49
218	Jean Fasnacht	Hong Kong	38:50
219	Adiat Salah	Kuwait	39:09
220	Ahmad Helal	Kuwait	39:09
221	M.Ibrahim Haji	Kuwait	39:11
222	Sighvatur Gudmundsson	Iceland	39:17
223	Hugh Dunkley	Jamaica	39:28
224	Harfteinn Oskarsson	Iceland	39:33
225	Keith Laing	Jamaica	39:35
226	Jukka Tammisuo	Finland	40:20
227	Marlon Williams	U.S. Virgin Islands	40:24
228	Gladstone Jones	Jamaica	40:29
229	Wallace Williams	U.S. Virgin Islands	40:38
230	Greg Johnson	U.S. Virgin Islands	40:41
231	Herman Crookes	Jamaica	41:12
232	Gunnar Birgisson	Iceland	41:15
233	Wong Kim Kueng	Hong Kong	41:18
234	Wong Ip Chor	Hong Kong	41:22
235	Hing Shih Wah	Hong Kong	41:25
236	Bill Chan	Hong Kong	41:25
237	Rafael Hernandez	Dominican Republic	41:26
238	Jeffrey Chung	Hong Kong	41:39
—	Gelindo Bordin	Italy	DNF
—	George Braidwood	Scotland	DNF

==== Teams ====
Rank	Team	Points
1st place, gold medalist(s)	Ethiopia: Bekele Debele / 8; Adugna Lema / 9; Mohammed Kedir / 16; Dereje Nedi / 24; Eshetu Tura / 31; Wodajo Bulti / 46; (Feyissa Abebe) / (96); (Hailu Wolde Tsadik) / (97); (Megersa Tulu) / (163)	134
2nd place, silver medalist(s)	United States: Pat Porter / 4; Ed Eyestone / 6; Craig Virgin / 17; John Easker / 28; Jeff Drenth / 41; Mark Stickley / 65; (John Idstrom) / (92); (Daniel Dillon) / (94); (Troy Billings) / (144)	161
3rd place, bronze medalist(s)	Portugal: Carlos Lopes / 1; Fernando Mamede / 23; Antonio Leitão / 25; João Campos / 26; Ezequiel Canario / 64; Joaquim Pinheiro / 84; (Fernando Couto) / (124); (Fernando Miguel) / (199); (João Silva) / (205)	223
4	Kenya: Wilson Waigwa / 5; Paul Kipkoech / 19; Joshua Kipkemboi / 39; Some Muge / 52; Omwanda Mirande / 57; Peter Kianga / 61; (Joseph Kiptum) / (63); (Andrew Masai) / (72); (Hillary Tuwei) / (123)	233
5	Italy: Francesco Panetta / 10; Alberto Cova / 11; Stefano Mei / 54; Franco Boffi / 55; Giuseppe Pambianchi / 60; Salvatore Antibo / 68; (Ranieri Carenza) / (80); (Marco Gozzano) / (82); (Gelindo Bordin) / (DNF)	258
6	England: Tim Hutchings / 2; Julian Goater / 30; Kevin Forster / 34; Peter Tootell / 49; Andy Holden / 69; Richard Partridge / 85; (Geoff Turnbull) / (87); (Steve Binns) / (113); (Eddie Herridge) / (158)	269
7	Spain: Luis Adsuara / 22; Jorge García / 27; Constantino Esparcia / 32; Vicente Polo / 50; Santiago Llorente / 58; Antonio Prieto / 81; (Cándido Alario) / (88); (Valentin Rodríguez) / (93); (José Manuel Albentosa) / (120)	270
8	New Zealand: Rex Wilson / 20; John Bowden / 33; David Burridge / 38; Shane Marshall / 44; Tom Birnie / 70; Dallas McCallum / 71; (Paul Ballinger) / (103); (Derek Froude) / (145)	276
9	France: Pierre Levisse / 7; Dominique Chauvelier / 36; Philippe Legrand / 51; Jean-Louis Prianon / 77; Alex Gonzalez / 90; Jacques Boxberger / 110; (Didier Bernard) / (117); (Pascal Debacker) / (139); (Thierry Watrice) / (150)	371
10	Ireland: John Treacy / 13; John Woods / 35; John O'Toole / 66; Richard O'Flynn / 67; Robert Costelloe / 102; Tony O'Leary / 105; (Roy Dooney) / (141); (Kingston Mills) / (162)	388
11	West Germany: Christoph Herle / 12; Hans-Jürgen Orthmann / 45; Frank Zimmermann / 53; Michael Scheytt / 56; Konrad Dobler / 114; Robert Schneider / 122; (Bernd Rangen) / (128); (Martin Grüning) / (189)	402
12	Belgium: Theo van den Abeele / 59; Karel Lismont / 62; Jef Gees / 73; Werner Mory / 79; Ghilsmain Fourrier / 91; Jean-Pierre Paumen / 95; (Jos Maes) / (104); (Raymond van Paemel) / (111); (Roger de Vogel) / (152)	459
13	Netherlands: Stijn Jaspers / 18; Klaas Lok / 40; Tonnie Dirks / 98; Hans Koeleman / 109; Martin ten Kate / 130; Marc Borghans / 134; (Cor Lambregts) / (166)	529
14	Sweden: Jan Hagelbrand / 74; Lars-Erik Nilsson / 76; Mats Erixon / 89; Tommy Persson / 101; Pär Wallin / 116; Lars Ericsson / 135; (Hans Segerfeldt) / (138); (Dan Glans) / (161)	591
15	Wales: Steve Jones / 3; Kenneth Davies / 108; Andrew Evans / 119; Nigel Adams / 126; Tony Blakewell / 132; Chris Buckley / 167; (Tony Simmons) / (169); (Ieuan Ellis) / (171); (Alun Roper) / (193)	655
16	Canada: Paul McCloy / 42; Alain Bordeleau / 48; Ron Becht / 107; Robert Cook / 125; Adrian Shorter / 155; Randy Cox / 180; (Rheal Desjardins) / (182)	657
17	Mexico: Eduardo Castro / 29; Gerardo Alcala / 37; Jesús Herrera / 83; Roberto Silva / 153; Raul Ceja / 165; Francisco Medina / 214; (Fredeberto Sanchez) / (216)	681
18	Denmark: Niels Kim Hjorth / 14; Keld Johnsen / 100; Lars Bo Sørensen / 137; Henrik Albahn / 157; Ralph Petersen / 159; Per Hoffmann / 164; (Christian Wolfsberg) / (173); (Jens Hansen) / (212)	731
19	Finland: Martti Vainio / 15; Henrik Sandström / 78; Jari Nurmisto / 129; Ilpo Jousimaa / 181; Jukka Viitasaari / 213; Jukka Tammisuo / 226	842
20	Scotland: Lawrie Spence / 112; Ross Copestake / 131; Edward Stewart / 143; Terence Mitchell / 146; Fraser Clyne / 149; Alex Gilmour / 168; (James Egan) / (170); (Charles Haskett) / (175); (George Braidwood) / (DNF)	849
21	Switzerland: Kurt Huerst / 121; Roland Hertner / 133; Beat Steffen / 136; Marius Hasler / 140; Martin Schmid / 142; Hugo Rey / 178	850
22	China: Zhang Guowei / 43; Wu Zhihan / 154; Cui Yulin / 156; Cong Ming / 160; Fu Bangrong / 174; Yang Lin / 183	870
23	Colombia: Jairo Correa / 86; Joaquin Leano / 106; Domingo Tibaduiza / 115; Cesar Sabagol / 202; Placido Martin / 203; Alvaro Palacios / 206	918
24	Northern Ireland: Deon McNeilly / 118; Terry Greene / 148; Steve Martin / 151; Cameron Spence / 176; Samuel Doherty / 179; Eddie Oxlade / 186	958
25	Puerto Rico: Nestor Moreno / 172; Sadot Méndez / 185; Roberto Ramos / 187; Israel Díaz / 197; Pablo Rodríguez / 207; Jorge Alvarado / 217	1165
26	Jamaica: Derick Adamson / 188; Michael Feurtado / 194; Joseph Cross / 195; Cebert Cooper / 208; Hugh Dunkley / 223; Keith Laing / 225; (Gladstone Jones) / (228); (Herman Crookes) / (231)	1233
27	Iceland: Jón Didriksson / 190; Sigurdur Sigmundsson / 198; Agust Thorsteinsson / 215; Sighvatur Gudmundsson / 222; Harfteinn Oskarsson / 224; Gunnar Birgisson / 232	1281
28	Hong Kong: John Arnold / 201; Paul Stapleton / 204; Tim Soutar / 210; Jean Fasnacht / 218; Wong Kim Kueng / 233; Wong Ip Chor / 234; (Hing Shih Wah) / (235); (Bill Chan) / (236); (Jeffrey Chung) / (238)	1300

- Note: Athletes in parentheses did not score for the team result

== Participation ==
An unofficial count yields the participation of 240 athletes from 37 countries in the Senior men's race. This is in agreement with the official numbers as published.

- Australia (1)
- Belgium (9)
- Canada (7)
- China (6)
- Colombia (6)
- Denmark (8)
- Dominican Republic (2)
- England (9)
- Ethiopia (9)
- Finland (6)
- France (9)
- Hong Kong (9)
- Hungary (2)
- Iceland (6)
- Ireland (8)
- Israel (1)
- Italy (9)
- Jamaica (8)
- Japan (5)
- Kenya (9)
- Kuwait (5)
- Mexico (7)
- Netherlands (7)
- New Zealand (8)
- Northern Ireland (6)
- Palestine (1)
- Portugal (9)
- Puerto Rico (6)
- Scotland (9)
- Spain (9)
- Sweden (8)
- Switzerland (6)
- United States (9)
- U.S. Virgin Islands (3)
- Venezuela (1)
- Wales (9)
- West Germany (8)

== See also ==
- 1984 IAAF World Cross Country Championships – Junior men's race
- 1984 IAAF World Cross Country Championships – Senior women's race
