= Athletics at the 1983 Summer Universiade – Men's marathon =

The men's marathon event at the 1983 Summer Universiade was held in Edmonton, Canada on 9 July 1983.

== Results ==
| Rank | Athlete | Nationality | Time | Notes |
|---|---|---|---|---|
| 1st place, gold medalist(s) | Alessio Faustini | Italy | 2:17:10 | |
| 2nd place, silver medalist(s) | Giovanni D'Aleo | Italy | 2:17:20 | |
| 3rd place, bronze medalist(s) | Michael Spöttel | West Germany | 2:18:12 | |
| 4 | Toshihiro Shibutani | Japan | 2:18:50 | |
| 5 | Yevgeniy Okorokov | Soviet Union | 2:18:55 | |
| 6 | Yakov Tolstikov | Soviet Union | 2:22:31 | |
| 7 | Lloyd Ness | United States | 2:22:51 | |
| 8 | Christopher Bunyan | Great Britain | 2:24:22 | |
| 9 | Alessandro Rastello | Italy | 2:25:19 | |
| 10 | Patrick Asakettle | New Zealand | 2:26:37 | |
| 11 | Aliosha Karushkov | Bulgaria | 2:26:55 | |
| 12 | Shigemasa Ikeda | Japan | 2:27:34 | |
| 13 | Roy Lambert | Canada | 2:27:52 | |
| 14 | Mario Pérez | Mexico | 2:31:51 | |
| 15 | Esau Zwane | Swaziland | 2:32:02 | |
| 16 | Francisco Silva | Mexico | 2:46:28 | |
| | Mark Orzel | Canada | DNF | |
| | Gerhard Krippner | West Germany | DNF | |
| | Michael Buist | New Zealand | DNF | |
