= Nottingham Marathon =

Marathon in Nottingham, England

The Nottingham 'Robin Hood' Marathon, is a race in Nottingham, England held every year since 1981, with the exception of 2020. The race today incorporates a half-marathon and a fun-run. A corporate relay event is also held in which teams of five runners from local companies and businesses run legs of 2–3 miles on the half-marathon course.

The original race started and finished in the Old Market Square, in Nottingham City Centre. From 1982 onwards the race has started and finished from the Victoria Embankment taking in some of Nottingham's most historical and scenic sights, including the City Centre and Nottingham Castle, Wollaton Park, the University of Nottingham and the National Watersports Centre at Holme Pierrepont.

In 2005 Runners World Magazine readers voted the race the number two marathon in the United Kingdom.

The full marathon was dropped for the 2012 event because of "issues with the route around Holme Pierrepont". The half-marathon event was held on a revised route. In 2013 the marathon returned after being cancelled in 2012, following revisions to the route to allow for greater participant safety. It was again dropped in 2018 having 'failed to meet the organisers' aspirations'.

The 2020 event was cancelled due to COVID-19. The half marathon and fun runs returned in 2021. The 43rd race is due to be held on September 29th 2024

== Winners ==
Key: Course record

=== Half marathon ===
Year	Men's winner	Time (h:m:s)	Women's winner	Time (h:m:s)
1981	Richard Milne (Wales)	1:06:55	Cherry Hanson	1:15:26
1982	Richard Milne (Wales)	1:06:38	Jill Clarke	1:20:41
1983	James Merryfield	1:05:51	Angela Smith	1:23:42
1984	Christopher Woodhouse	1:05:06	Ann Bankowska	1:21:30
1985	David Driver	1:06:47	Rosemary Hill	1:24:24
1986	Jeremy Watson	1:07:41	Jacqueline Davis	1:27:30
1987	David Lewis	1:08:20	Linda Rushmere (Southwell)	1:19:29
1988	David Lewis	1:05:31	Heather Jennings	1:16:57
1989	David Lewis	1:04:43	Heather Jennings	1:18:40
1990	David Lewis	1:06:24	Linda Rushmere (Southwell)	1:19:22
1991	Richard Ironmonger (Notts AC)	1:06:09	Jacqueline Davis	1:20:05
1992	James Gombetza (Zimbabwe)	1:05:22	Annette Bell (Lincoln Wellington)	1:16:54
1993	Michael Pearson	1:07:26	Ann Ford (Redhill Road Runners)	1:20:34
1994	James Harrison (Australia)	1:05:41	Linda Rushmere (Southwell)	1:16:38
1995	Alan Chilton	1:08:08	Carol Holmes	1:15:16
1996	Richard Ironmonger (Notts AC)	1:09:06	Carol Holmes	1:17:31
1997	Eamonn Hyland (Redhill Road Runners)	N/A	Ann Ford	N/A
1998	Michael Pearson	1:09:24	Claire Naylor	1:20:22
1999	Malcolm Price	1:06:12	Elizabeth Allott	1:14:38
2000	Vince Garner	1:08:25	Claire Naylor	1:18:13
2001	Andrew Pearson	1:08:15	Tara Krzywicki (Charnwood)	1:17:09
2002	William Musyoki (Kenya)	1:07:10	Alison Fletcher (Dulwich)	1:17:37
2003	Phillip Sly (Australia)	1:05:31	Lisa Knights (Sutton-in-Ashfield)	1:20:49
2004	Zachary Kihara Njoroge (Kenya)	1:05:21	Hawa Hussein (Tanzania)	1:14:25
2005	Paul Langat Kipkemboi (Kenya)	1:03:25	Catherine Mutua (Kenya)	1:15:24
2006	Simon Kasimili (Kenya)	1:03:42	Caroline Cheptanui Kilel (Kenya)	1:13:32
2007	Simon Tanui (Kenya)	1:04:09	Jane Muia Mwikali (Kenya)	1:14:00
2008	Ezekiel Cherop (Kenya)	1:05:28	Banuela Katesigwa (Tanzania)	1:16:36
2009	Ezekiel Cherop (Kenya)	1:05:43	Joyce Kirui (Kenya)	1:16:57
2010	Gordon Mugi Mahugu (Kenya)	1:04:47	Sara Kiptoo Cheriwoi (Kenya)	1:16:54
2011	Elisha Tarus Meli (Kenya)	1:05:52	Dorcus Chesang (Kenya)	1:14:40
2012	Luka Rotich (Kenya)	1:01:38	Agnes Chebet (Kenya)	1:13:33
2013	Aaron Scott	1:06:54	Polline Wanjiku	1:16:10
2014	Matthew Kimutai	1:04:23	Gladys Kwambai	1:14:25
2015	Morris Gachaga	1:02:34	Sharon Barlow	1:19:32
2016	Barnaba Kipkoech	1:05:55	Winfridah Moseti	1:12:57
2017	Chris Thompson	1:04:58	Emily Waugh	1:18:01
2018	Chris Rainsford	1:07:54	Katherine Wood	1:17:34
2019	Anthony Woodward	1:12:19	Samantha Harrison	1:14:39
2020	Race not held due to COVID-19			
2021	William Strangeway	1:07:41	Megan Rosier	1:25:49
2022	Kadar Omar	1:05:37	Sarah Lowery	1:23:50

=== Marathon ===
Year	Men's winner	Time (h:m:s)	Women's winner	Time (h:m:s)
1982	Michael Palmer	2:21:21	Janet Milburn	3:17:00
1983	Trevor Hawes (Wales)	2:23:54	Ann Curtis (Scotland)	2:55:54
1984	Nicholas Lees	2:21:40	Eleanor Robinson (Ripley)	2:48:55
1985	Phil Hall	2:25:15	Eleanor Robinson (Ripley)	2:55:18
1986	Trevor Hawes (Wales)	2:26:14	Eleanor Robinson (Ripley)	2:57:14
1987	Trevor Hawes (Wales)	2:22:34	Eleanor Robinson (Ripley)	2:48:23
1988	Trevor Hawes (Wales)	2:24:31	June Cowper	2:47:37
1989	Steven Needs (Telford)	2:24:53	Eleanor Robinson (Ripley)	2:52:46
1990	Steven Needs (Telford)	2:23:43	Jacqueline Davis	2:46:11
1991	Eamonn Hyland (Redhill Road Runners)	2:23:17	Elizabeth Clarke	2:53:59
1992	Nick Ballard	2:25:13	Jacqueline Casey	2:50:19
1993	Eamonn Hyland (Ireland)	2:20:09	Hayley Nash (Newport)	2:42:49
1994	Oelof Vorster (South Africa)	2:22:44	Gillian Kennedy	2:58:46
1995	Oelof Vorster (South Africa)	2:23:10	Barbara Stevens	2:59:41
1996	Oelof Vorster (South Africa)	2:23:46	Avril Allen (Kimberley)	2:55:04
1997	Mark Burnhope (Wolverhampton & Bilston)	2:19:51	Susan Dolan (Ireland)	2:49:21
1998	Christopher Parkes	2:25:43	Eleanor Robinson (Ripley)	2:59:11
1999	Gary Staines (South London)	2:27:25	Mandy Spink (Nottingham)	2:52:31
2000	Andrew Wetherill (Redhill Road Runners)	2:24:41	Mandy Spink (Nottingham)	2:45:10
2001	Jamie Jones (Overton)	2:35:42	Mandy Spink (Nottingham)	2:54:15
2002	Tim Hartley (Shepshed)	2:37:23	Carin Hume (Windsor, Slough & Eton)	2:56:56
2003	Darren Bilton (Leeds City)	2:25:16	Helen Burrell (Redhill Road Runners)	2:56:31
2004	Jeremy Bateman (Ripley)	2:45:26	Penny Wilson (Fleet and Crookham)	3:10:58
2005	Pumlani Bangani (Salford Harriers)	2:23:21	Beth Eburne (Hinckley)	2:25:32
2006	Pumlani Bangani (Salford Harriers)	2:30:00	Nicola Clay (Stilton)	2:52:24
2007	Nathaniel Williams (North York Moors)	2:29:40	Jenny Murray (Stockport)	2:55:25
2008	Pumlani Bangani (Salford Harriers)	2:25:28	Debra Mason (Rotherham)	2:53:16
2009	David Kirkland (Alnwick)	2:26:43	Jenny Bosman (Redhill Road Runners)	2:58:17
2010	Thomas Hughes (North Belfast)	2:29:13	Jenny Bosman (Redhill Road Runners)	2:58:37
2011	Carl Allwood (Sutton-in-Ashfield)	2:38:40	Sarah Harris (Long Eaton)	2:47:47
2012	Race not held			
2013	Neil Renault	2:27:08	Melissa Pritchard	2:59:15
2014	Pere Capdevilla	2:28:33	Kay Walsha	2:54:06
2015	Christopher Zablocki	2:24:22	Sarah Davis-Foxon	3:04:10
2016	Adam Holland	2:37:25	Joanne Nelson	2:56:09
2017	Cristobal Ortigosa	2:31:50	Sonka Reimers	2:55:05
