= Garoto (composer) =

Brazilian composer (1915–1955)

Aníbal Augusto Sardinha (June 28, 1915 - May 3, 1955), known by his professional name, Garoto (The Kid), was a Brazilian composer and performer on an array of plucked string instruments including the guitar, tenor guitar, 7-string guitar, banjo, cavaco, cavaquinho, and the bandolim. He was also a singer in several of the ensembles in which he performed. An important performer and composer of Brazilian choro, his compositions, influenced by American jazz, anticipated the development of bossa nova. Garoto performed and collaborated with many important musicians, including guitarists Paraguassú, Aimoré, Serelepe, Armando Neves (Armandinho) and Laurindo Almeida, as well as Carmen Miranda and Radamés Gnattali. He also recorded on several labels, including Parlophone (Brazil), Odeon, Continental, and RCA-Victor, and performed on the radio for Rádio Educadora Paulista (São Paulo), Rádio Cosmos (São Paulo), Rádio Cruzeiro do Sul, Rádio Record, Rádio Mayrink Veiga, Rádio Tupi, and Rádio Nacional.

== Early life and career ==
Garoto was born in São Paulo, Brazil to Portuguese immigrants Antônio Augusto Sardinha and Adosinda dos Anjos Sardinha and grew up in the working-class neighborhood of Vila Economisadora. He was their fifth child and the first born in Brazil. He first learned music in the home; his father and older brothers, Inocêncio and Batista, played a variety of plucked string instruments. By the time he was 11, he proficient enough on the banjo and guitar to play with a local ensembles, most notably the group Conjunto dos Sócios, earning the nickname "Moleque do Banjo" (The Banjo Kid). Under the mentorship of guitarist Paraguassú, Garoto's opportunities expanded in São Paulo, including recording with Paraguassú and on several movie soundtracks.

Garoto's professional life blossomed after 1930 when he began working with the ensembles Verde e Amarelo and Chorões Sertanejos, which traveled widely in the São Paulo area playing at cafés, theatres and cinemas. The same year he was given the opportunity to record two of his compositions for guitar and banjo duet, Bichnho de queijo and Drublando, on the Parlophone label under the artistic direction on Francisco MIgnone. His career coincided with the emergence of the broadcast of urban popular music on the radio in Brazil which had previously focused on playing Western classical music. The two genres of music coexisted in the radio environment and would exert mutual influence on the development of both styles in Brazil. As a talented multi-instrumentalist, Garoto would become one of the most sought-after musicians for live concerts, radio performance and in the recording studio. One of his most active musical collaborations was with the guitarist Aimoré (Jose Alves da Silva, b.1908), a co-member of Chorões Sertanejos. The two formed a duo that performed extensively in São Paulo and the surrounding countryside through 1938.

His career developed steadily through the 1930s: In 1931 he participated in a competition sponsored by Rádio Educadora de São Paulo and the newspaper A Gazeta. Judged by popular vote, he took sixth place in the "banjo" category. The same year he began playing for Rádio Educadora de São Paulo. In 1933 he began classical guitar instruction with Atílio Bernardini, who was the first to establish a school of guitar based on the method of Francisco Tárrega.

Garoto traveled to Rio de Janeiro for the first time in 1936 when he and Aimoré were invited to play for Rádio Mayrink Veiga alongside some of the best musicians in Rio. He worked playing parties and concerts in addition to performing for the radio for several months until, exhausted and in poor health, he returned to São Paulo in December. He spent 1937 and most of 1938 in São Paulo playing with Aimoré for Rádio Cruzeiro do Sul, Orquestra Columbia, and Rádio Cosmos. On October 26, Garoto left his hometown to move permanently to Rio de Janeiro.

== Rio de Janeiro and trip to America ==
Once in the capitol, Garoto returned to Rádio Mayrink Veiga where he met Laurindo Almeida with whom he formed the quartet Cordas Quentes (Hot Strings) and the Duo do Ritmo Sincopado. A more important relationship he would form at Rádio Mayrink Veiga was with Carmen Miranda. Miranda would invite Garoto to join her ensemble, Bando da Lua, on their trip to the United States in 1939. The trip began with a Broadway appearance for Miranda and the Bando da Lua in The Streets of Paris and resulted in the start of Miranda's Hollywood career and her appearance in three films, Down Argentine Way (1940), That Night in Rio (1941), and Weekend in Havana (1941). In these films, Garoto performed on a variety of string instruments and provided background vocals. A virtuoso performer, he improvised introductions to many musical numbers, performed as an opening act for Miranda's stage acts, and was notable enough to often receive his own billing.

Miranda and her musicians traveled to New York, Washington, Toronto, Pittsburgh, Detroit, Chicago, St. Louis, and San Francisco. Garoto also had the opportunity of direct exposure to American jazz. He commented that he was impressed by Bing Crosby, Tony Martin, and Ella Fitzgerald and notes that he had seen the Tommy Dorsey Orchestra perform. Garoto made a big enough impression with his performances that Art Tatum and Duke Ellington visited him. The trip also gave Miranda, Banda da Lua, and Garoto the opportunity to perform for Franklin D. Roosevelt in celebration of his seventh year as president. Miranda and her entourage returned to Brazil on July 10, 1940. When she returned to the US in October of that year, she did so with Bando da Lua, but did not invite Garoto.

== Later career ==
Garoto returned to Rio de Janeiro and continued to work in radio and in the recording studio. He was hired by Rádio Nacional in 1942 where he played with the radio orchestra under the direction of Radamés Gnattali. Gnattali wrote several pieces for Garoto to perform: the "Serestas" (1944) for flute, guitar and string quartet; "Tocata em Ritmo de Samba" (1950) for guitar solo, the Concertino no. 2 for guitar and orchestra (1953) and Suite para piano e violão (Suite for piano and guitar). In 1952, he formed his last ensemble, Trio Surdina, playing the guitar with Rafael Lemos Jr. (Fafá Lemos) on the violin and Romeu Seibel (Chiquinho) on the accordion.

On May 3, 1955, Garoto died of a heart attack at the age of 39.
