= Seresta =

Seresta may refer to:

- Oxazepam – Benzodiazepine medication
- Seresta (music) – Brazilian music style
