= Yakov Tolstikov =

Russian distance runner

Personal information
- Born: 20 May 1959 (age 67) Prokopyevsk, Soviet Union

Sport
- Sport: Marathon running

Yakov Grigoryevich Tolstikov (Russian: Я́ков Григо́рьевич То́лстиков; born 20 May 1959) is a former Russian distance runner. Tolstikov rose to worldwide prominence following his surprise upset of favorite Gelindo Bordin in the 1991 London Marathon. He set a personal best of 2:09:17 hours at the race which went unbeaten as a Soviet record. This time was the fastest by any European in the 1991 season, and the third fastest time in the world after Kōichi Morishita and Takeyuki Nakayama of Japan.

In international competition he represented the Unified Team at the 1992 Summer Olympics in Barcelona, Spain, coming in a distant 22nd. He twice ran at the World Championships in Athletics, coming eleventh in 1987 but failing to finish in 1991. He was a marathon bronze medallist at the 1986 Goodwill Games.

In individual races, he won the Uzhhorod Marathon three times (1983, 1986, 1987), the 1984 Moscow International Peace Marathon, the 1995 Siberian International Marathon, and the 1990 Humarathon. He was a one-time national champion, winning the marathon at the Soviet Athletics Championships in 1988.

== International competitions ==
Year	Competition	Venue	Position	Event	Notes
Representing the Soviet Union
1983	Universiade	Edmonton, Canada	6th	Marathon	2:22:31
1986	Goodwill Games	Moscow, Soviet Union	3rd	Marathon	2:16:22
1987	World Championships	Rome, Italy	11th	Marathon	2:16:55
1988	European Marathon Cup	Huy, Belgium	9th	Marathon	2:14:10
1988	European Marathon Cup	Huy, Belgium	1st	Marathon team	31 pts
1989	World Marathon Cup	Milan, Italy	4th	Marathon team	6:39:18
1990	European Championships	Split, Yugoslavia	—	Marathon	DNF
1991	World Marathon Cup	London, United Kingdom	8th	Marathon team	6:40:09
1991	World Championships	Tokyo, Japan	—	Marathon	DNF
Representing the Unified Team
1992	Olympic Games	Barcelona, Spain	22nd	Marathon	2:17:04
Representing Russia
1994	European Championships	Helsinki, Finland	20th	Marathon	2:15:32

== Marathons ==
Year	Competition	Venue	Position	Event	Notes
1983	Uzhhorod Marathon	Uzhhorod, Soviet Union	1st	Marathon	2:13:35
1984	Moscow Peace Marathon^{[nb]}	Moscow, Soviet Union	1st	Marathon	2:10:48
1985	Soviet Championships	Mogilev, Soviet Union	4th	Marathon	2:13:14
1986	Uzhhorod Marathon	Uzhhorod, Soviet Union	1st	Marathon	2:11:43
1987	Uzhhorod Marathon	Uzhhorod, Soviet Union	1st	Marathon	2:11:05
1987	Soviet Championships	Mogilev, Soviet Union	7th	Marathon	2:13:50
1987	Fukuoka Marathon	Fukuoka, Japan	8th	Marathon	2:12:31
1988	Soviet Championships	Tallinn, Soviet Union	1st	Marathon	2:14:29
1988	Chicago Marathon	Chicago, United States	2nd	Marathon	2:09:20
1989	Beppu-Ōita Marathon	Beppu–Ōita, Japan	2nd	Marathon	2:12:35
1989	Milano City Marathon	Milan, Italy	19th	Marathon	2:15:35
1990	London Marathon	London, United Kingdom	6th	Marathon	2:11:07
1991	London Marathon	London, United Kingdom	1st	Marathon	2:09:17 PB
1991	Italian Marathon	Carpi, Italy	11th	Marathon	2:13:05
1991	Fukuoka Marathon	Fukuoka, Japan	9th	Marathon	2:12:07
1992	London Marathon	London, United Kingdom	6th	Marathon	2:10:49
1992	Fukuoka Marathon	Fukuoka, Japan	6th	Marathon	2:12:06
1993	Siberian International Marathon	Omsk, Russia	2nd	Marathon	2:13:31
1994	Vienna City Marathon	Vienna, Austria	3rd	Marathon	2:12:55
1995	Tokyo Marathon	Tokyo, Japan	5th	Marathon	2:11:34
1995	Siberian International Marathon	Omsk, Russia	1st	Marathon	2:14:37
1997	Siberian International Marathon	Omsk, Russia	4th	Marathon	2:17:46

- ^{nb} The Friendship Games Marathon was hosted within the Moscow International Peace Marathon in 1984 and Tolstikov was the second fastest runner there, but did not receive a Friendship Games medal as he was not entered for the team.
