= Bill Donakowski =

American long-distance runner

Personal information
- Nationality: American
- Born: June 21, 1956 Flint, Michigan
- Died: October 15, 2017 (aged 61)

Sport
- Sport: Track, long-distance running
- Events: 5000 metres, 10,000 metres, half marathon, marathon
- College team: Michigan

Achievements and titles
- Personal bests: 5000m: 13:32.15; 10,000m: 28:13.9 ½ marathon: 1:02:15; Marathon: 2:10:41

William Donakowski (June 21, 1956 – October 15, 2017) was an American distance runner. He represented the United States at the IAAF World Cross Country Championships in 1979, 1981, and 1983. He was the men's winner of the 1986 Twin Cities Marathon. He is a brother of Gerard Donakowski.

== Running career ==
Donakowski studied and ran at University of Michigan. At the 1978 Tennessee Dogwood Relays, he recorded 28:25.8 in the 10,000 meters. Which stood as the University of Michigan 10,000 meter school record until 2024. He ran his personal best time over 10,000 meters at the 1979 Penn Relays, where he finished in 28:13.9.

After his studies, he transitioned into a marathoner. He won the 1986 Twin Cities Marathon in a personal best time of 2:10:40, taking home $25,000 in prize money. He was a pre-race favorite at the 1988 US Olympic Trials for the marathon, but dropped out due to a sore achilles tendon.
