= Athletics at the Friendship Games – Men's marathon =

The men's marathon event at the Friendship Games was held on 18 August 1984 in Moscow, Soviet Union, together with the annual Moscow International Peace Marathon. Apart from the elite runners, about 5000 amateurs took part.

== Results ==
Rank	Name	Nationality	Time	Notes
1st place, gold medalist(s)	Dereje Nedi	Ethiopia	2:10:31	
–	Yakov Tolstikov*	Soviet Union	2:10:48	
2nd place, silver medalist(s)	Abebe Mekonnen	Ethiopia	2:11:30	
3rd place, bronze medalist(s)	Li Jong-hyong	North Korea	2:11:44	
4	Jerzy Skarżyński	Poland	2:13:23	
–	Pyotr Saltykov*	Soviet Union	2:13:31	
5	Yevgeniy Okorokov	Soviet Union	2:15:18	
–	Vladimir Beloborodov*	Soviet Union	2:15:56	
6	Viktor Semyonov	Soviet Union	2:17:34	
–	Igor Pereverzyev*	Soviet Union	2:17:34	
–	Sergey Krestyaninov*	Soviet Union	2:17:34	
–	Aleksey Kopayev*	Soviet Union	2:17:42	
–	Zamiliy Abramov*	Soviet Union	2:17:51	
–	Nikolay Ivanov*	Soviet Union	2:17:58	
7	Mojmír Láníček	Czechoslovakia	2:17:59	
–	Vladimir Davalov*	Soviet Union	2:17:59	
8	Che Choi-ho	North Korea	2:18:20	
9	Vladimir Nikityuk	Soviet Union	2:18:30	
10	Andrés Chávez	Cuba	2:18:48	
–	Aleksandr Yeruantsev*	Soviet Union	2:18:48	
–	Farid Zharipov*	Soviet Union	2:19:05	
–	Vladimir Dremov*	Soviet Union	2:19:11	
–	Valeriy Mitukhin*	Soviet Union	2:19:17	
–	Viktor Trunev*	Soviet Union	2:19:47	
–	Vitaliy Dryaunov*	Soviet Union	2:19:50	
–	Viktor Levkin*	Soviet Union	2:19:53	
11	Antoni Niemczak	Poland	2:20:06	
12	Choe Myong-sam	North Korea	2:25:53	
	Wojciech Ratkowski	Poland	DNF	

*Out of competition performance

== See also ==
- Athletics at the 1984 Summer Olympics – Men's marathon
