= Marc Borghans =

Dutch runner

Personal information
- Nationality: Netherlands
- Born: Marcus Gerardus Jozef Maria Borghans; 1 April 1960 (age 65) Beek, Netherlands

Sport
- Sport: Athletics
- Event(s): 1500 metres, cross country

Marc Borghans (born 1 April 1960) is a former Dutch middle- and long-distance runner. He competed in the 1988 European Athletics Indoor Championships and two editions of the World Athletics Cross Country Championships (1984 and 1987).

Marc and his wife, Milenka, sister of Moré Galetovic, live in Chicago with their son, Roberto.
