= Trio Surdina =

Brazilian instrumental music trio, 1951–1968

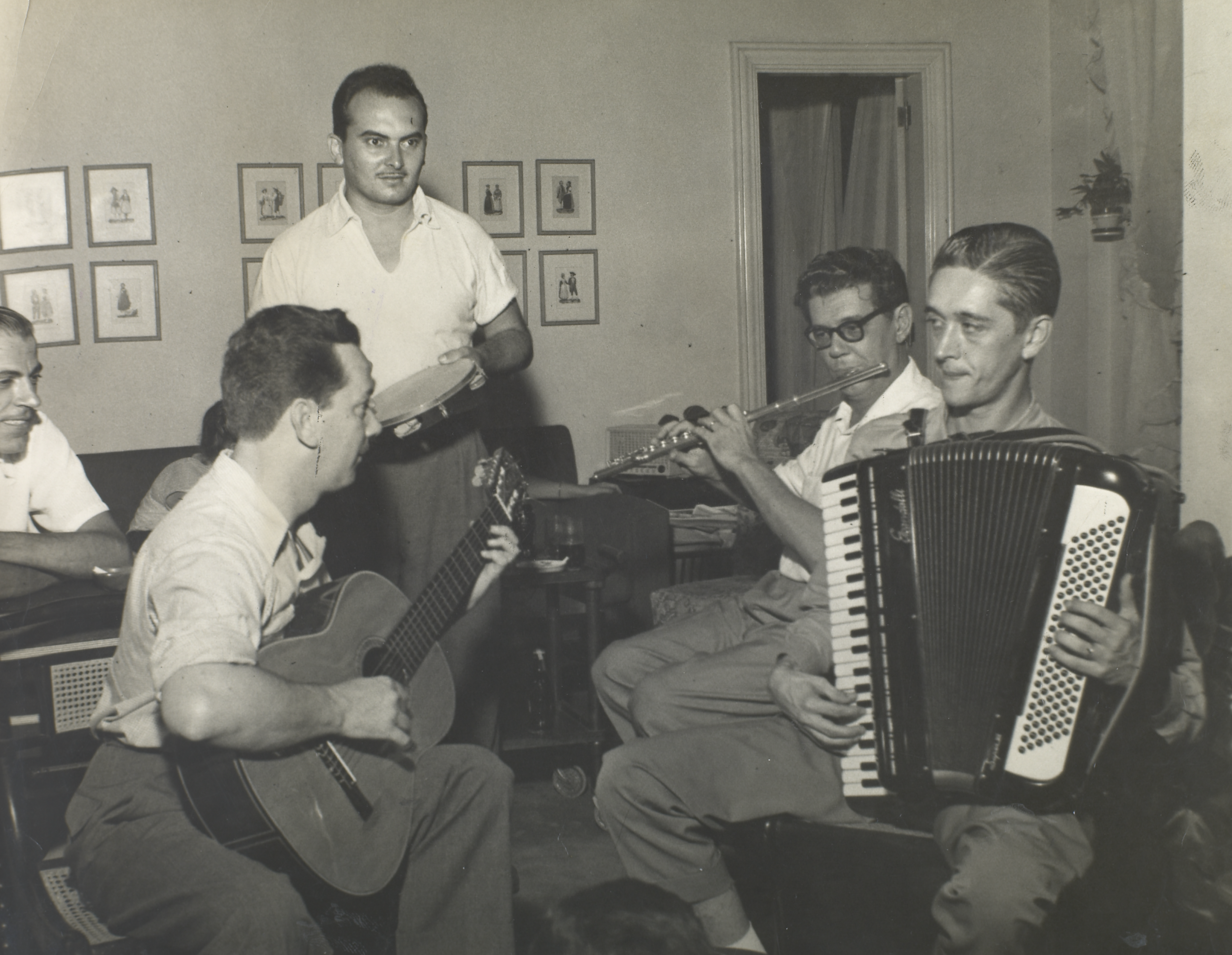
- Trio Surdina members Garoto and Chiquinho do Acordeon alongside Radamés Gnatalli and Billy Blanco

Background information
- Origin: Rio de Janeiro
- Genres: Samba, Bolero
- Years active: 1953-1968
- Labels: Musidisc
- Members: Garoto; Fafá Lemos; Chiquinho do Acordeon

Trio Surdina was an instrumental music trio created in 1951 and initially composed by the Brazilian musicians Garoto, Fafá Lemos, and Chiquinho do Acordeon. The trio was formed in the context of the radio show Música em Surdina, presented by singer Paulo Tapajós at Rádio Nacional.

The trio's name alludes to the radio show in which it debuted and to its musical style, featuring suave, muted melodies in contrast to the louder styles preferred by the orchestras and crooners of the late 1940s and early 1950s.

The trio's first formation recorded four albums, all published by Musidisc, a label owned by the singer and producer Nilo Sérgio. Bassist Pedro Vidal Ramos and percussionist Bicalho also contributed to some of the tracks.

- Trio Surdina
- Trio Surdina Interpreta Noel Rosa e Dorival Caymmi (Trio Surdina nº 2)
- Trio Surdina e Orquestra Léo Peracchi
- Trio Surdina nº 3

The initial formation lasted until 1955 and was dissolved upon the death of Garoto. Musidisc, being the owner of the "Trio Surdina" name, continued releasing albums under that title until 1968:

- Boleros Famosos, Vol. 1
- Aquarela do Brasil
- Boleros Famosos, Vol. 2
- Ouvindo Trio Surdina, Vol. 1
- Ary Barroso, Dorival Caymmi, Noel Rosa
- Ouvindo Trio Surdina, Vol. 2
- Ouvindo Trio Surdina, Vol. 3
- Festival No. 1, com Orlando Silva, Roberto Luna, Típica D’Avilis, Trio Surdina, Rosaria Meireles, Nilo Sérgio, Leo Peracchi & Orchestra, Leal Brito
- No Mundo do Baião, Vol. 1, com Leal Brito & Orquestra, Três Marias, Trio Surdina, e outros
- No Mundo do Bolero, Vol. 1, com Trio Surdina, Djalma Ferreira, Elvira Rios, e outros
- Canções de Natal, com Trio Surdina e Nilo Sérgio.

== Relationship to Bossa Nova ==
Trio Surdina was created five years before what is understood as the first Bossa Nova album, but its music already featured some of the distinctive elements of that style, and the trio is seen by many as a precursor of Bossa Nova:

Many of the elements that would be made famous by the Bossa Nova style are already intimately part of Trio Surdina's distinctive musical style. The nod to "restraint" is not a part of the trio's name only: their performances show a particular interrelationship between instruments in what concerns the rhythmic-harmonic conduction, interpretation of the main melody, secondary themes, etc., in which its style is kept free of "excesses" or "artificial" elements.
