= Hailu Wolde-Tsadik =

Ethiopian middle-distance runner

Personal information
- Nationality: Ethiopian
- Born: 25 May 1950 (age 76)

Sport
- Sport: Middle-distance running
- Event: Steeplechase
Medal record
Men's athletics
Representing Ethiopia
World Cross Country Championships
| Gold medal – first place | 1984 East Rutherford | Senior team |
| Gold medal – first place | 1985 Lisbon | Senior team |

Hailu Wolde-Tsadik (born 25 May 1950) is an Ethiopian middle-distance runner. He was a two-time World Athletics Cross Country Championships gold medallist as a member of the Ethiopian team, and he competed in the men's 3000 metres steeplechase at the 1980 Summer Olympics.

== Career ==
Wolde was a member of the Ethiopian team at the 1977 Philips International Athletes Clubs' international cross country running race at Crystal Palace, London. He finished 12th behind Miruts Yifter and Dereje Nedi, and it was noted that his team would have won the team title if they had more runners.

In 1979, Wolde finished 3rd in a steeplechase competition in Sochi, Russia, running 8:30.7.

The month before the 1980 Olympics, Wolde was runner-up at a Bratislava meeting, running 8:28.0 for the steeplechase at altitude. The time was a personal best.

Wolde was seeded in the 3rd 3000 m steeplechase heat at the 1980 Moscow Olympics. He ran 8:40.98 to place 8th, advancing to the semi-finals on time. In the semi-finals, Wolde ran 8:34.94 and again finished 8th, failing to advance to the finals.

In June 1981, Wolde won a 5000 metres competition in 13:49.03 in Berlin. Two years later, he finished 14th at the 1983 Rieti Meeting 5000 m, running 13:56.68.

Wolde would go on to win two gold medals at the 1984 and 1985 World Athletics Cross Country Championships. At the 1984 race in East Rutherford, New Jersey, he finished 97th and was the 8th finisher for Ethiopia. In the 1985 Lisbon senior race, he finished 55th overall and was the 6th scorer for Ethiopia, contributing to their gold medal finish. The 1985 team was decided via a national trials.
