= 1978 Berlin Marathon =

5th Berlin Marathon
- Venue: Berlin, West Germany
- Date: 3 September

Champions
- Men: Michael Spöttel (2:20:02)
- Women: Ursula Blaschke (2:57:09)

The 1978 Berlin Marathon was the 5th running of the annual marathon race held in Berlin, West Germany, held on 3 September. West Germany's Michael Spöttel won the men's race in 2:20:02 hours, while the women's race was won by West Germany's Ursula Blaschke in 2:57:09. A total of 197 runners finished the race, comprising 187 men and 10 women.

== Results ==
=== Men ===
| Rank | Athlete | Nationality | Time |
|---|---|---|---|
| 1st place, gold medalist(s) | Michael Spöttel | West Germany | 2:20:02 |
| 2nd place, silver medalist(s) | Michael Weiß | West Germany | 2:24:32 |
| 3rd place, bronze medalist(s) | Rainer Gemmecke | West Germany | 2:26:33 |

=== Women ===
| Rank | Athlete | Nationality | Time |
|---|---|---|---|
| 1st place, gold medalist(s) | Ursula Blaschke | West Germany | 2:57:09 |
| 2nd place, silver medalist(s) | Gerda Reinke | West Germany | 2:59:23 |
| 3rd place, bronze medalist(s) | Christa Kloth | West Germany | 3:00:57 |
