= Chen Chang-ming =

Taiwanese long-distance runner

Personal information
- Nationality: Taiwanese
- Born: 陈长明, Pinyin: Chén Cháng-míng; 2 December 1955
- Died: 9 January 2019 (aged 63)

Sport
- Sport: Long-distance running
- Event: Marathon

Chen Chang-ming (2 December 1955 – 9 January 2019) was a Taiwanese long-distance runner. He competed in the marathon at the 1984 Summer Olympics.
