= Carlos José =

Brazilian singer-songwriter (1934–2020)

- Born: Carlos José Ramos dos Santos; September 22, 1934; São Paulo, São Paulo, Brazil
- Died: May 9, 2020 (aged 85) Rio de Janeiro, Rio de Janeiro, Brazil
- Genres: Seresta
- Instrument: Vocals
- Years active: 1957–2020
- Labels: Polydor Records, Odeon Records, Continental Records, CBS Records International, RCA Records, Polydisc

Carlos José Ramos dos Santos (22 September 1934 – 9 May 2020), better known as simply Carlos José, was a Brazilian singer-songwriter of the genre seresta.

== Life ==
He started his singing career at Um Instante Maestro, a radio program created by Flávio Cavalcanti and broadcast at Rádio Nacional Rio de Janeiro.

Active from 1957 to 2020, José released eight studio albums and one extended play from 1959 to 2005, with two of them being a compilation of greatest hits.

Aside from musical career, Carlos José also had a law degree, and practiced law for a couple of years before giving up to pursue a full time musical career.

== Personal life and death ==
On 9 May 2020, José died in Rio de Janeiro due to complications brought on by COVID-19 during the COVID-19 pandemic in Brazil.

At the time of his death, José was married to Vera Goulart. José also had two heirs from his previous marriage to journalist Maria D'Ajuda.

== Discography ==
=== Studio albums ===
Year	Album	Album details
1959	LP Carlos José	Label: Odeon Records; Format: Vinyl
1960	Carlos José Canta Para Você	Label: Continental Records; Format: Vinyl
1963	A Poesia de Caymmi va voz de Carlos José	Label: Continental Records; Format: Vinyl
1965	LP Carlos José	Label: CBS Records International; Format: Vinyl
1972	LP Carlos José	Label: CBS Records International; Format: Vinyl
1974	LP Carlos José	Label: Polydor Records; Format: Vinyl
1977	Os Grandes Sucessos de Carlos José	Label: CBS Records International; Format: Vinyl
2005	20 Super Sucessos de Carlos José – Vol. 2	Label: Polydisc; Format: CD

=== Extended plays ===
Year	Album	Album details
1975	CPD: Carlos José	Label: RCA Records; Format: Vinyl
