= Göran Högberg =

Swedish long-distance runner (1948–2019)

Personal information
- Nationality: Swedish
- Born: 20 December 1948 Sollefteå, Sweden
- Died: 21 January 2019 (aged 70)

Sport
- Sport: Long-distance running
- Event: Marathon

Göran Högberg (20 December 1948 – 21 January 2019) was a Swedish long-distance runner. He competed in the marathon at the 1980 Summer Olympics.
