= Stijn Jaspers =

Dutch runner (1961–1984)

Personal information
- Born: 23 June 1961 Raalte, the Netherlands
- Died: 18 October 1984 (aged 23) Clemson, South Carolina, United States
- Height: 1.88 m (6 ft 2 in)
- Weight: 74 kg (163 lb)

Sport
- Sport: Running
- Club: Clemson University

Augustinus Antonius Maria "Stijn" Jaspers (23 June 1961 – 18 October 1984) was a Dutch track and field athlete. He competed in the 5000 m event at the 1984 Summer Olympics, but failed to reach the final. In 1983 he won national titles in the 1500 m and 5000 m events.

After completing military service with the Dutch Navy in Driehuis, in 1982 he went to study at Clemson University, South Carolina, United States. He died in his sleep in his room at Clemson, of a rare heart deficiency, which doctors have not detected in him previously.

His younger brother Paul Jaspers is a retired sprint and middle-distance runner.
