= Fritz Rüegsegger =

Swiss long-distance runner

Personal information
- Nationality: Swiss
- Born: 7 May 1950 (age 76)

Sport
- Sport: Long-distance running
- Event: 5000 metres

Fritz Rüegsegger (born 7 May 1950) is a Swiss long-distance runner. He competed in the men's 5000 metres at the 1972 Summer Olympics.
