= John Christiansen =

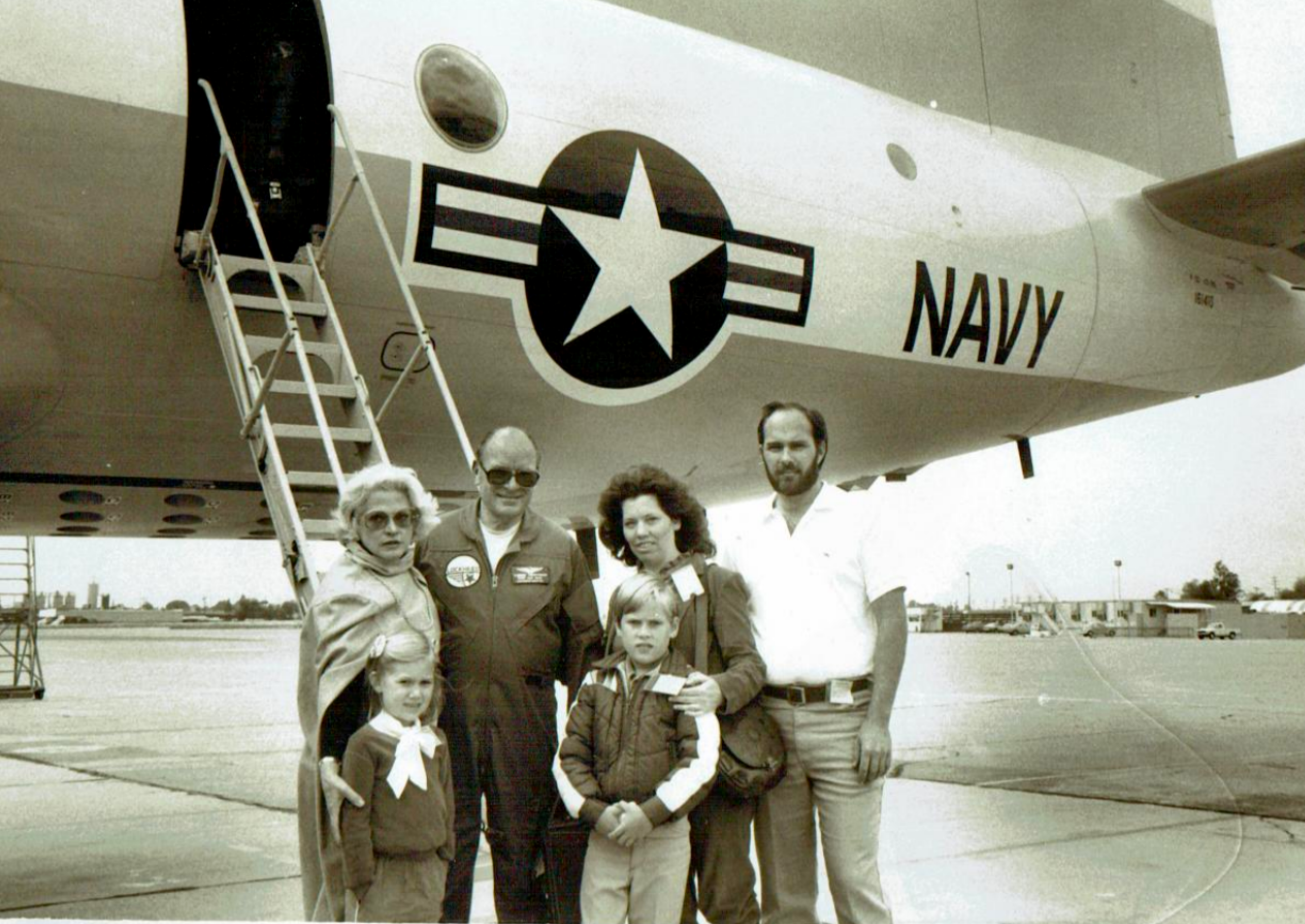
Christiansen with family in front of P-3 Orion, 1984.

John “Chris” Christiansen (May 1, 1923 － September 12, 1998) was an American test pilot. He was the chief military test pilot for Lockheed California Company for over 30 years. He might be most known for having performed Lockheed S-3 Viking's maiden flight on January 21, 1972. His assignments also included the initial test flights of Lockheed P-3 Orion. Christiansen was born in Oslo, Norway in 1923 and became an American citizen in 1939. He later served in the U.S. Navy during World War II and the Korean War. He began experimental flying for Lockheed Martin in 1953, and worked there until his retirement in 1984. He was a fellow at Society of Experimental Test Pilots.

Christiansen retired in May 1984 after 31 years as an experimental test pilot for Lockheed Martin. He moved to Tarzana, Los Angeles following his retirement. He died on September 12, 1998, in Lake Havasu City, Arizona.

Christiansen is honored at the U.S. Navy Patrol and Reconnaissance Memorial on Naval Air Station Whidbey Island in Washington, which was erected by the United States Navy. The memorial inscription reads: "Special thanks to Mr. John Christiansen for his many contributions to the development and testing of the P-3. Lockheed P-3 Orion. Missions: Patrol, Antisubmarine Warfare, Electronic Warfare and Reconnaissance."
