= Sergio Pesavento =

Italian long-distance runner

Personal information
- Nationality: Italian
- Born: 11 January 1958
- Died: March 6, 2022 (aged 64)

Sport
- Country: Italy
- Sport: Athletics
- Event: Long-distance running

Achievements and titles
- Personal best: 5000 m: 13:37.75 (1984)

Sergio Pesavento (11 January 1958 - 6 March 2022) was a former Italian male long-distance runner who competed at one edition of the IAAF World Cross Country Championships at senior level (1982).
