= Joseph Otieno =

Kenyan long-distance runner

Personal information
- Nationality: Kenyan
- Born: 19 May 1958 (age 68)

Sport
- Sport: Long-distance running
- Event: Marathon

Joseph Otieno (born 19 May 1958) is a Kenyan long-distance runner. He competed in the marathon at the 1984 Summer Olympics.
