= Richard Milne =

British flying ace of WWII (1919–2004)

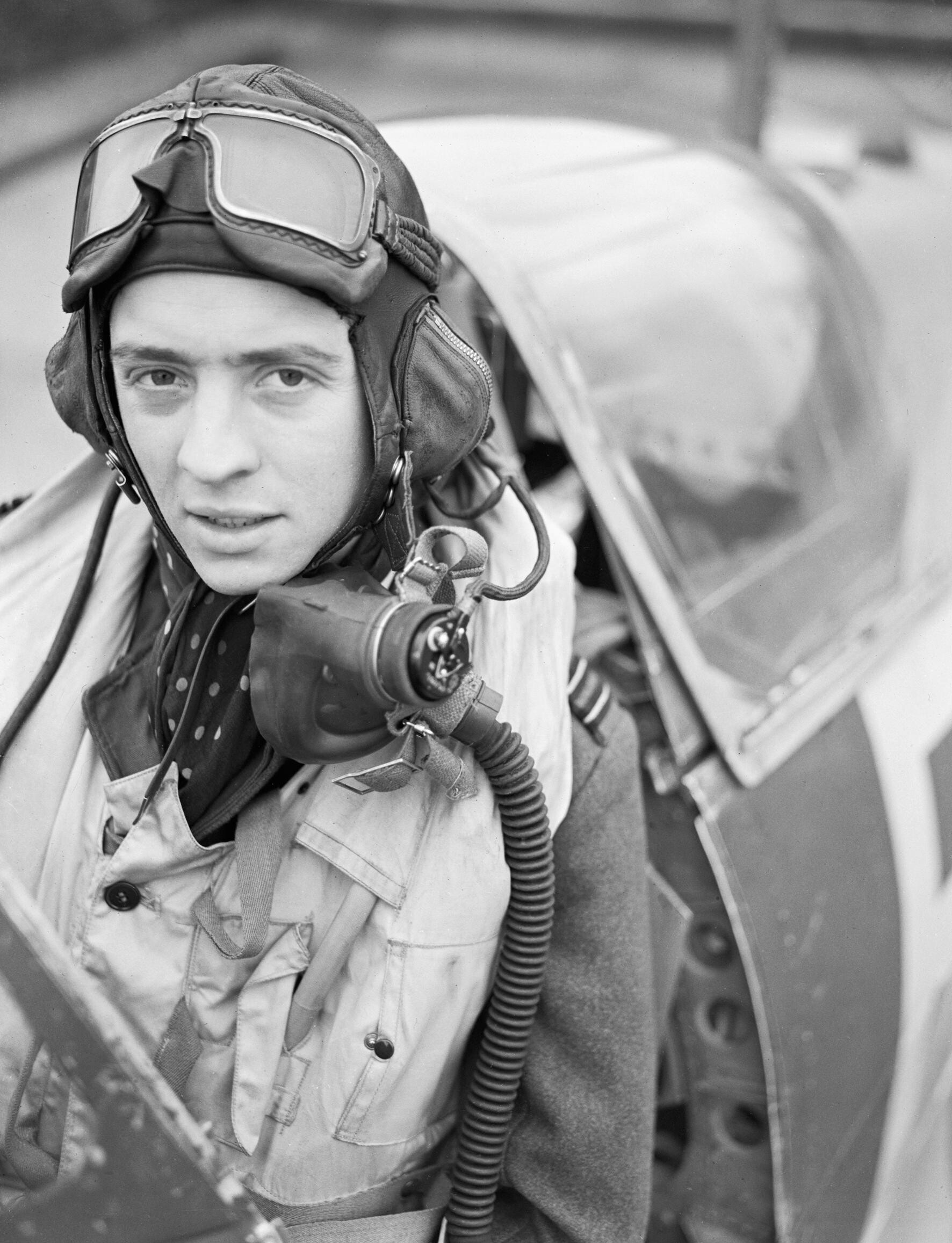
- Milne in the cockpit of his Supermarine Spitfire, February 1943
- Born: 8 July 1919; Edinburgh, Scotland
- Died: 2004 (aged 84–85); Andorra
- Military career
- Allegiance: United Kingdom
- Branch: Royal Air Force
- Rank: Wing Commander
- Commands: No. 92 Squadron; No. 222 Squadron; Biggin Hill Wing
- Conflicts: Second World War: Battle of France; Battle of Britain; Circus offensive
- Awards: Distinguished Flying Cross & Bar
- Other work: Aviation industry

Richard Milne, DFC & Bar (8 July 1919 – 2004) was a British flying ace of the Royal Air Force (RAF) during the Second World War. He is credited with the destruction of at least fifteen aircraft.

Born in Edinburgh, Milne joined the RAF in 1937. At the time of the outbreak of the Second World War, he was serving with No. 151 Squadron. With this unit, he flew Hawker Hurricane fighters during the Battle of France and then in the subsequent Battle of Britain. He claimed several aerial victories during this period, and was awarded the Distinguished Flying Cross (DFC). In 1941 he commanded No. 92 Squadron and achieved further successes during the RAF's Circus offensive for which he was awarded a Bar to his DFC. He was appointed the leader of the Biggin Hill Wing in January 1943, but was shot down two months later and spent the remainder of the war as a captive of the Germans. Briefly serving in the RAF in the postwar period, he later worked in the aviation industry. He retired to Andorra, where he died in 2004.

== Early life ==
Richard Maxwell Milne was born on 8 July 1919 in Edinburgh, Scotland. He went to school at Cheltenham College, leaving at the end of 1935. Eighteen months later he joined the Royal Air Force (RAF) on a short service commission. He trained at No. 11 Flying Training School, where he was a particularly proficient student, finishing top in flying and air gunnery. He was posted as a pilot officer to No. 8 Armament Training Station at Evanton in May 1938, where he served as a staff pilot. In early 1939, he was assigned to No. 151 Squadron. This was based at North Weald, from where it operated Hawker Hurricane fighters as part of London's aerial defences.

== Second World War ==
For the first several months of the Second World War, No. 151 Squadron was tasked with intercepting unidentified aircraft and pursuing stray barrage balloons. During this period, Milne was promoted to flying officer. Following the invasion of France on 10 May 1940, the squadron began operating from Vitry in France and was heavily engaged. Milne destroyed a Junkers Ju 87 dive bomber 50 miles (80 km) to the east of Valenciennes on 17 May and then the next day shot down a Messerschmitt Bf 110 heavy fighter over Vitry although this latter aerial victory was not confirmed. On 22 May he destroyed a Ju 87 near Merville. The squadron was withdrawn to Martlesham Heath in England following the end of its campaign in France in late May. From here it provided cover for the British Expeditionary Force as it was evacuated from Dunkirk and was then drawn into aerial engagements with the Luftwaffe over the Thames estuary in the opening stages of the Battle of Britain.

=== Battle of Britain ===
In the afternoon of 9 July, Milne's flight intercepted a large group of Luftwaffe bombers and their escorting fighters. In the resulting engagement, he shot down a Messerschmitt Bf 109 fighter near Margate. He shared in the destruction of a Dornier Do 17 medium bomber that was attacking shipping near Harwich on 12 July. On 29 July Milne damaged a Bf 110, part of a group of aircraft attacking a convoy off Harwich. Milne destroyed a pair of Do 17s on 13 August and two days later shot down a Bf 109 near Dover.

On 18 August, what is now known as The Hardest Day, Milne destroyed a Heinkel He 111 medium bomber off the mouth of the River Crouch. He reported seeing the aircraft explode and it crashed into the sea. This was his final aerial victory of the battle over the southeast of England for No. 213 Squadron was dispatched to Digby, part of No. 12 Group, for a rest from intensive operations. Prior to this, and in recognition of his successes of the preceding months, Milne was awarded the Distinguished Flying Cross. The citation, published in The London Gazette on 30 August, read:

Flying Officer Milne has personally destroyed seven enemy aircraft, and seriously damaged a number of others. He has led his section throughout with skill and courage, and has set an example to other members of the squadron.

— The London Gazette, No. 34935, 30 August 1940

In November, Milne was sent to the Central Flying School at Upavon for training as an instructor. Following this he instructed at No. 8 Elementary & Reserve Flying Training School for a time. In January 1941 he was promoted to flight lieutenant and returned to Upavon to serve as an instructor on the staff there. In mid-1941 he returned to operational flying with a posting to No. 92 Squadron. This was engaged in the RAF's Circus offensive, flying its Supermarine Spitfire fighters from Biggin Hill on sorties to German-occupied France.

=== Squadron command ===
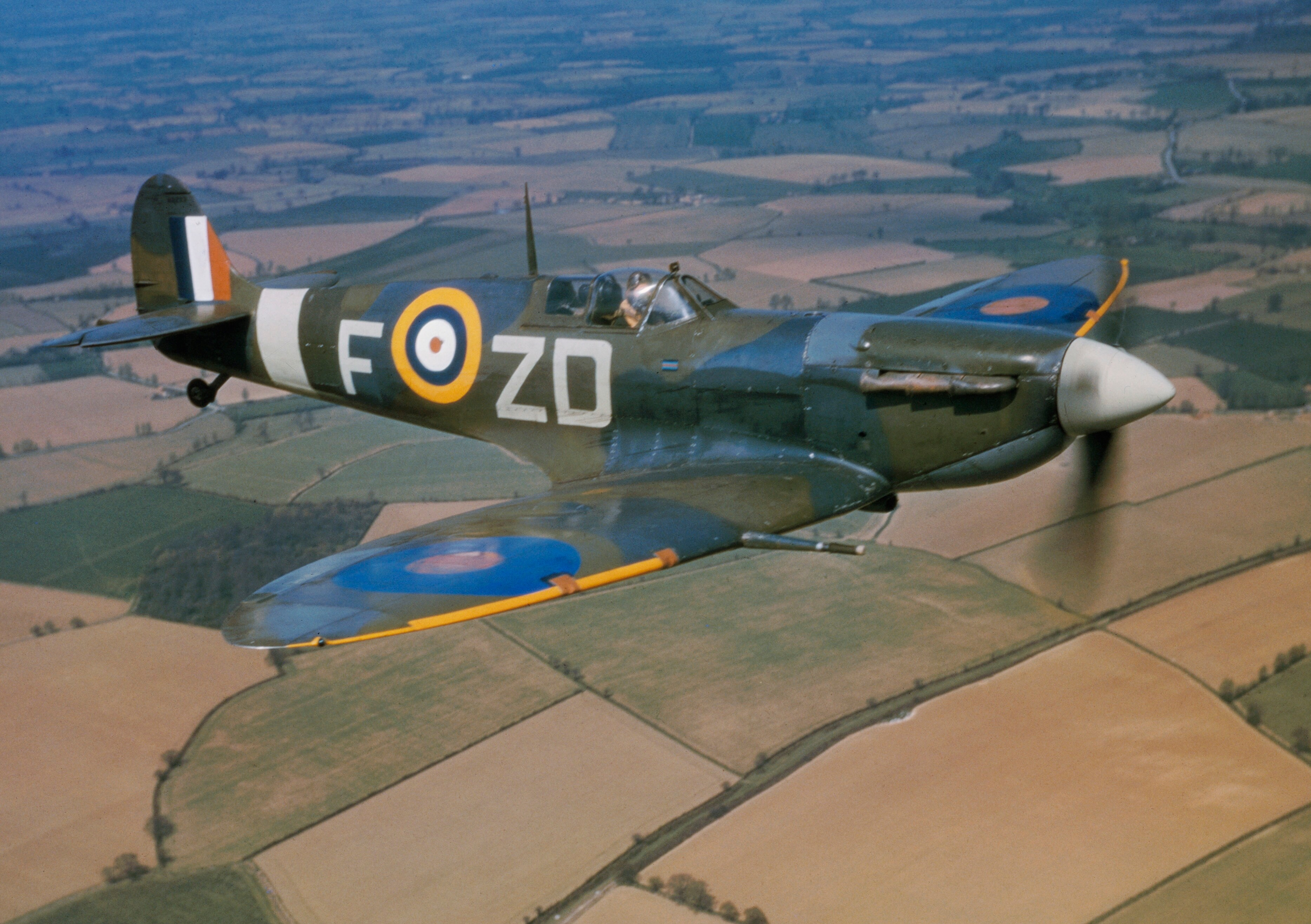
Milne at the controls of his Supermarine Spitfire fighter, 1942

Initially a flight commander with No. 92 Squadron, Milne was appointed acting squadron leader and became its commander in September. He probably destroyed a Bf 109 to the southwest of Saint-Omer on 27 September, also damaging a second Bf 109. On 13 October he was flying on his own at low altitude to Saint-Omer due to problems with his oxygen supply and encountered a Bf 109 which he was able to evade. He broke off his sortie and was on his return flight to the squadron's new airfield at Gravesend when he engaged and destroyed one Bf 109 and damaged a second. He was then attacked by two more Bf 109s but managed to shoot down one of these, which collided with the other Bf 109 causing it to crash as well. A few days later he was rested with a brief posting to the Middle East as part of a mission to advise on tactics and strategy in the Western Desert campaign. Milne was awarded a Bar to his DFC in November. The published citation read:

Since assuming command in September 1941, this officer has led the squadron on 19 offensive operations over enemy territory. In the course of these operations, Squadron Leader Milne has destroyed at least 3 and damaged 2 enemy aircraft, bringing his total victories to 11 destroyed, 2 probably destroyed and 11 damaged. His leadership has been characterised by dash and good judgment.

— London Gazette, No. 35341, 11 November 1941

In January 1942, Milne was appointed to command of No. 222 Squadron. Stationed at North Weald and operating Spitfires, his new unit carried out sorties to France. In May Milne was tasked with establishing an Fighter Command Air Gunnery School at Ipswich for the training of fighter squadrons.

=== Wing leader ===
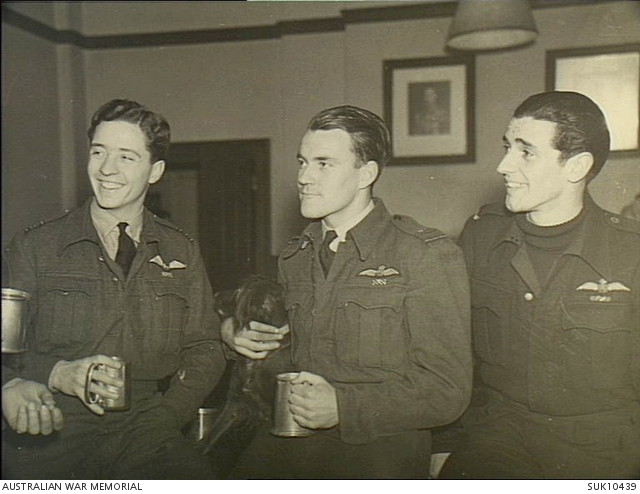
Milne (left) stands next to Squadron Leader Hugo Armstrong, January 1943

At the start of 1943, he was promoted to temporary wing commander and appointed wing leader of the Biggin Hill Wing. On one of his earliest sorties as wing leader, carried out on 20 January, he destroyed a Focke Wulf 190 fighter to the south of Dungeness and a Bf 109 near Pevensey. On 10 March he shot down a Fw 190 near Béthune in France. His final sortie as wing leader was on 14 March. On this occasion he destroyed a Fw 190 in the vicinity of Berck but his Spitfire was damaged in a subsequent engagement with German fighters near Hardelot. With his engine leaking coolant, he baled out into the English Channel. Collected by a German vessel he spent the remainder of the conflict in a Prisoner-of-war camp. During his captivity, his squadron leader rank was made substantive.

== Postwar period ==
Repatriated to the United Kingdom after the end of the war, Milne continued to serve in the RAF. He was a staff officer at the headquarters of No. 13 Group for a period of time, then was appointed wing leader at North Weald. He ended his service in the RAF in 1946, holding the rank of wing commander.

Returning to civilian life, Milne was employed by the English Electric Company (EEC), working in its aircraft manufacturing division. His role included liaising with the Royal Australian Air Force and the United States Air Force in relation to the building under licence of EEC's Canberra bomber as well as sales of the aircraft to South American countries. After EEC was subsumed to form the British Aircraft Corporation in 1960, Milne subsequently worked for the Military Aircraft Sales Organisation. He retired to Andorra, where he died in 2004.

Milne is credited with having destroyed fifteen aircraft, one being shared with another pilot. In addition, a sixteenth aircraft destroyed was unconfirmed. He is also believed to have probably destroyed one more aircraft. He damaged eleven aircraft although details of eight of these are not available.
