= Raymond Curran =

Gaelic footballer

Raymond Curran is a former Gaelic footballer who played for Enniskillen Gaels and the Fermanagh county team. He won an All-Ireland Senior B Football Championship in 1996, when – towards the end of the first game – he was fouled for a free, which was then scored to bring about a replay. Curran appeared in an Ulster Senior Club Football Championship final for his club in 2002, helping Enniskillen come from behind in the quarter-final against St Gall's. He played as a defender.
