= Seresta (music) =

Brazilian music style

- Native name: Portuguese: Seresta
- Etymology: Serenada
- Cultural origins: First half of the 20th century, Brazil
- Typical instruments: bandolin; acoustic guitar; accordion; flute; cavaquinho

Seresta is a traditional Brazilian music style from the first half of the 20th century. The musician who plays seresta is called a seresteiro.

In the 1960s, the Museum of Seresta and Serenata (Portuguese: Museu da Seresta e da Serenata) opened in Valença, Rio de Janeiro. The municipality also hosts events like the "Seresteiros Festival".

== Description ==
Seresta music can be purely instrumental or accompanied by singing.

Seresta is characterized by the amorous and nostalgic atmosphere of a Brazilian serenade with tempo variations. It is common for the genre to alternate between a sequential, expressive, and sentimental melody and a lively waltz with metrical ambiguity. Seresta is played with instruments like bandolin, acoustic guitar, accordion, flute, and cavaquinho and has a romantic thematic.

== Famous seresteiros ==
- Guilherme de Brito
- Vicente Celestino
- Carlos José
- Júlio Medaglia

== See also ==
- Arrocha
- Baião
- Chôro
- Frevo
- Sertanejo
