= Toshihiro Shibutani =

Japanese long-distance runner

Personal information
- Born: August 30, 1962 (age 63)

Sport
- Sport: Marathon running

Toshihiro Shibutani (born August 30, 1962) is a retired long-distance runner from Japan, who won the 1988 edition of the Fukuoka Marathon, clocking 2:11:04 on December 4, 1988.

== Achievements ==
- All results regarding marathon, unless stated otherwise

Year	Competition	Venue	Position	Notes
Representing Japan
1986	Lake Biwa Marathon	Ōtsu, Japan	1st	2:14:55
1988	Fukuoka Marathon	Fukuoka, Japan	1st	2:11:04
