= Giuseppe Pambianchi =

Italian long-distance runner

Personal information
- Nationality: Italian
- Born: 27 January 1957 (age 69)

Sport
- Country: Italy
- Sport: Athletics
- Event: Long-distance running

Achievements and titles
- Personal best: 5000: 13:39.62 (1984)

Giuseppe Pambianchi (born 27 January 1957) is a former Italian male long-distance runner who competed at two editions of the IAAF World Cross Country Championships at senior level (1982, 1984).
