= Rex Wilson (runner) =

New Zealand long-distance runner (born 1960)

Personal information
- Full name: Rex Albert Wilson
- Born: 10 April 1960 (age 66) Whanganui, New Zealand
- Height: 1.72 m (5 ft 8 in)
- Weight: 62 kg (137 lb)

Rex Albert Wilson (born 10 April 1960 in Whanganui) is a retired New Zealand long-distance runner, who represented his native country at the 1992 Summer Olympics in Barcelona. There he finished in 16th place in the men's marathon, clocking 2:15:51. He set his personal best (2:10:48) in the classic distance in 1990.

In 1990, Wilson was awarded the New Zealand 1990 Commemoration Medal.

After his Olympic career came to a close he became a volunteer firefighter, something he continues to this day as chief. On this experience he has said "people say they do it for the community, but I do it for me."

He also runs a jewellery store in Paihia with his wife. They has been the victim of several ram raids.

After Wilson was diagnosed with stage four cancer in mid 2022, 15 years to the month after he raised $15,052 for cancer research. He had a robot remove his prostate.

He has a daughter.

== Achievements ==
Year	Competition	Venue	Position	Event	Notes
Representing New Zealand
1990	Commonwealth Games	Auckland, New Zealand	7th	Marathon	2:13:48
1992	Olympic Games	Barcelona, Spain	16th	Marathon	2:15:51
