= Michael Spöttel =

German marathon runner

Personal information
- Born: Bad Nauheim, West Germany
- Occupation: Author

Sport
- Sport: Athletics
- Club: TSV Verden; LG Kreis Verden
Medal record
West German National Championships
Gold medal – first place	1979	Marathon
Gold medal – first place	1982	25km
Representing West Germany
Marathon
Major Marathons
Gold medal – first place	1978 Berlin	Marathon
Summer Universiade
Bronze medal – third place	1983 Edmonton	Marathon

Michael Spöttel is a German former marathon runner and author. As a runner, he won the 1978 Berlin Marathon, and came third in the marathon race at the 1983 Summer Universiade. He won West German National Championships in the marathon and 25 km race.

== Running career ==
Michael Spöttel competed for TSV Verden, and LG Kreis Verden. In 1977, he won the West German junior 10,000 metres, and team cross-country running titles.

Spöttel won the 1978 Berlin Marathon in a time of 2:20:03, four minutes ahead of Michael Weiß who finished second. In 1979, he won the marathon event at the West German National Championships in a time of 2:20:15. In 1982, Spöttel won the 25 kilometres (16 mi) race at the German National Championships.

He came third in the marathon race at the 1983 Summer Universiade. In the same year, he won the Paderborner Osterlauf half-marathon event. In 1984, he set the Lower Saxony regional marathon record, finishing in a time of 2:12:53. That year, he set a personal best time of 2:12:51 at the Houston Marathon. He competed in the marathon event at the 1987 World Championships in Athletics, finishing 19th.

Spöttel retired in 1990.

== Personal life ==
Spöttel was born in Bad Nauheim, West Germany, and grew up in Bremen. He studied ethnology in Munich, and also earned a PhD. In 2015, he moved to Woltmershausen.

== Works ==
- Die ungeliebte "Zivilisation" (The unloved "civilisation"), Lang, 1995 (in German)
- Hamiten (Hamites), Lang, 1996 (in German)
- Max Weber und die jüdische Ethik (Max Weber and the Jewish ethics), Lang, 1997 (in German)
- Vergebliche Hoffnung (Futile hope), Alibri Verlag, 2006 (in German)
