= Derek Froude =

New Zealand distance runner

Derek Owen Froude (born 20 April 1959 in Wellington) is a former long-distance runner from New Zealand, who represented his native country at two Summer Olympics: 1984 (Los Angeles) and 1992 (Barcelona). He finished in 34th and 35th place in the men's marathon. He set his personal best (2:11:25) in the classic distance in 1983.

== Achievements ==
- All results regarding marathon, unless stated otherwise

Year	Competition	Venue	Position	Notes
Representing New Zealand
1984	Olympic Games	Los Angeles, United States	34th	2:19:44
1992	Olympic Games	Barcelona, Spain	35th	2:19:37
1993	World Championships	Stuttgart, Germany	—	DNF
