= 1985 European Athletics Indoor Championships – Men's 3000 metres =

The men's 3000 metres event at the 1985 European Athletics Indoor Championships was held on 2 and 3 March.

== Medalists ==
Gold	Silver	Bronze
Bob Verbeeck; Belgium	Thomas Wessinghage; West Germany	Vitaliy Tyshchenko; Soviet Union

== Results ==
=== Heats ===
First 4 from each heat (Q) and the next 4 fastest (q) qualified for the final.

Rank	Heat	Name	Nationality	Time	Notes
1	1	Frank O'Mara	Ireland	7:58.12	Q
1	2	Bob Verbeeck	Belgium	7:58.12	Q
3	1	Dietmar Millonig	Austria	7:58.13	Q
4	2	Vitaliy Tyshchenko	Soviet Union	7:58.16	Q
5	2	Thomas Wessinghage	West Germany	7:58.20	Q
6	1	Romeo Živko	Yugoslavia	7:58.26	Q
7	2	Ivan Uvizl	Czechoslovakia	7:58.31	Q
8	2	Robert Nemeth	Austria	7:58.40	q
9	1	Walter Merlo	Italy	7:58.71	Q
10	1	Peter Klimeš	Czechoslovakia	7:58.81	q
11	1	Valeriy Abramov	Soviet Union	7:59.20	q
12	2	Stig Roar Husby	Norway	8:00.49	q
13	1	Jaime López	Spain	8:00.75	
14	1	Gábor Szabó	Hungary	8:00.85	
15	1	Zdravko Todorov	Bulgaria	8:01.65	
16	2	Volker Welzel	West Germany	8:03.50	
17	2	Tom Moloney	Ireland	8:15.28	
18	1	Karl Fleschen	West Germany	8:15.50	
	2	Stefano Mei	Italy	DNF	

=== Final ===
Rank	Name	Nationality	Time	Notes
1st place, gold medalist(s)	Bob Verbeeck	Belgium	8:10.84	
2nd place, silver medalist(s)	Thomas Wessinghage	West Germany	8:10.88	
3rd place, bronze medalist(s)	Vitaliy Tyshchenko	Soviet Union	8:10.91	
4	Frank O'Mara	Ireland	8:11.11	
5	Dietmar Millonig	Austria	8:11.21	
6	Robert Nemeth	Austria	8:11.24	
7	Romeo Živko	Yugoslavia	8:13.98	
8	Stig Roar Husby	Norway	8:14.70	
9	Ivan Uvizl	Czechoslovakia	8:15.11	
10	Valeriy Abramov	Soviet Union	8:15.11	
11	Peter Klimeš	Czechoslovakia	8:17.48	
12	Walter Merlo	Italy	8:20.54	
