= 1987 IAAF World Indoor Championships – Men's 3000 metres =

The men's 3000 metres event at the 1987 IAAF World Indoor Championships was held at the Hoosier Dome in Indianapolis on 6 and 8 March 1987.

The winning margin was 0.07 seconds which as of July 2024 remains the narrowest winning margin in the men's 3,000 metres at these championships.

== Medalists ==
Gold	Silver	Bronze
Frank O'Mara; Ireland	Paul Donovan; Ireland	Terry Brahm; United States

== Results ==
=== Heats ===
The first 3 of each heat (Q) and next 4 fastest (q) qualified for the final.

Rank	Heat	Name	Nationality	Time	Notes
1	2	Frank O'Mara	Ireland	7:54.07	Q
2	2	Doug Padilla	United States	7:54.58	Q
3	2	Pascal Thiébaut	France	7:54.79	Q
4	2	Julius Kariuki	Kenya	7:54.83	q
5	2	Jacinto Navarrete	Colombia	7:55.37	q, AR
6	2	Uwe Mönkemeyer	West Germany	7:55.39	q, PB
7	2	Mogens Guldberg	Denmark	7:56.02	q
8	2	Mauricio González	Mexico	7:56.99	NR
9	1	Paul Donovan	Ireland	7:58.05	Q
10	1	Terry Brahm	United States	7:58.17	Q
11	1	Mark Rowland	Great Britain	7:58.47	Q
12	1	Dietmar Millonig	Austria	7:58.74	
13	1	Bruno Levant	France	7:59.47	
14	1	Raf Wyns	Belgium	8:01.08	
15	2	Billy Dee	Great Britain	8:08.98	
16	1	Carey Nelson	Canada	8:11.72	
17	1	Wilson Waigwa	Kenya	8:17.23	
	1	Alessandro Lambruschini	Italy	DNF	
	2	Freddy Báez	Bolivia	DNS	

=== Final ===
Rank	Name	Nationality	Time	Notes
1st place, gold medalist(s)	Frank O'Mara	Ireland	8:03.32	CR
2nd place, silver medalist(s)	Paul Donovan	Ireland	8:03.89	
3rd place, bronze medalist(s)	Terry Brahm	United States	8:03.92	
4	Mark Rowland	Great Britain	8:04.27	
5	Doug Padilla	United States	8:05.55	
6	Julius Kariuki	Kenya	8:06.77	
7	Pascal Thiébaut	France	8:08.82	
8	Mogens Guldberg	Denmark	8:10.25	
9	Jacinto Navarrete	Colombia	8:11.89	
10	Uwe Mönkemeyer	West Germany	8:12.41	
