= 1987 World Championships in Athletics – Men's 5000 metres =

These are the official results of the Men's 5,000 metres event at the 1987 IAAF World Championships in Rome, Italy. There were a total of 36 participating athletes, with two qualifying heats and the final held on Sunday September 6, 1987.

== Medalists ==
Gold	Saïd Aouita; Morocco (MAR)
Silver	Domingos Castro; Portugal (POR)
Bronze	(United Kingdom) Jack Buckner; Great Britain (GBR)

== Records ==
Existing records at the start of the event.

World Record	Saïd Aouita (MAR)	12:58.39	Rome, Italy	July 27, 1987
Championship Record	Eamonn Coghlan (IRL)	13:28.53	Helsinki, Finland	August 14, 1983

== Final ==
This final was a rather typical "kicker's race," with a mostly slow early pace, and a very quick last lap. The strongest pre-race favourite, Morocco's Said Aouita, led for over 200 metres. After that, Kenya's John Ngugi moved into the lead. However, until about 2,200 metres, he ran wide either on the second lane or on the first lane's outer edge. After 900 metres, Ireland's John Treacy injected a more respectable speed into the sluggish early race. Despite his noticeable acceleration, Treacy's 1,000-metre split was only 2:49.96. After 1,600 metres, Ngugi again took the lead. As he led the 15-man field through 2,000 metres in 5:34.93, the runners were tightly clustered behind him. After 2,200 metres, the Kenyan suddenly surged. Only Aouita and Ireland's Frank O'Mara followed Ngugi closely. Before that lap was over, however, Ngugi slowed down again, and the field closed the gap on him. Due to Ngugi's surge, the 3,000-metre split was 8:16.19. The pace remained moderate during the fourth kilometre, with Ngugi leading at 4,000 metres in 10:58.60. Then the field began to break up. Britain's Steve Ovett, Ireland's Treacy, Canada's Carey Nelson, and Spain's Abel Anton started to lose contact with the main group. Another pre-race favourite, Switzerland's Pierre Deleze, had accelerated to the third place behind Ngugi and Aouita at 4,000 metres. Ovett was able to temporarily catch the leaders by 4,400 metres. Sydney Maree of the United States had drifted to the rear of the main group. By the second last home straight, also Ireland's O'Mara began to struggle with the increasing pace. Shortly before 4,600 metres, Aouita eased past Ngugi, and the Moroccan's unofficial split at 4,600 metres was 12:33.52. Portugal's Domingos Castro sprinted past Deleze into the second place on the final lap's front bend. Britain's Jack Buckner, Belgium's Vincent Rousseau, Ngugi, Bulgaria's Evgeni Ignatov, Britain's Tim Hutchings, Portugal's Dionisio Castro, O'Mara, Maree, and Ovett were still in contention. However, on the final back straight, Aouita further accelerated his pace, and only Domingos Castro and Deleze were able to follow him. Buckner and Rousseau formed the first chasing group, with Ignatov, Hutchings, and Dionisio Castro fighting for the sixth place. Ngugi drifted to the leading group's rear, and Ovett and Maree were about to pass him. By 4,800 metres, Aouita's victory already started to look certain, but Domingos Castro tenaciously remained ahead of Deleze. On the final home straight, Aouita's superior middle-distance runner's speed took him to an easy and clear victory. Domingos Castro was able to secure the silver medal, while Deleze faded badly during the last 20 metres, losing the bronze medal to the quickly finishing Buckner. Unofficially, Aouita sprinted the final 400 metres in 52.92 seconds. (The World Athletics Championships in Rome / Yleisurheilun MM-kisat Roomassa, Helsinki, Finland: The Runner Magazine (Juoksija-lehti), 1987; https://www.youtube.com/watch?v=7_sU4ncDVLY 1987, Frank O'Mara & John Treacy, 5000m Final, IAAF World Championships, Rome.)

RANK	FINAL	TIME
	Saïd Aouita (MAR)	13:26.44
	Domingos Castro (POR)	13:27.59
	Jack Buckner (GBR)	13:27.74
4.	Pierre Délèze (SUI)	13:28.06
5.	Vincent Rousseau (BEL)	13:28.56
6.	Evgeni Ignatov (BUL)	13:29.68
7.	Tim Hutchings (GBR)	13:30.01
8.	Dionisio Castro (POR)	13:30.94
9.	Frank O'Mara (IRL)	13:32.04
10.	Steve Ovett (GBR)	13:33.49
11.	Sydney Maree (USA)	13:33.78
12.	John Ngugi (KEN)	13:34.04
13.	John Treacy (IRL)	13:41.03
14.	Abel Antón (ESP)	13:43.58
15.	Carey Nelson (CAN)	13:43.81

== Qualifying heats ==
- Held on Friday 1987-09-04

RANK	HEAT 1	TIME
1.	Saïd Aouita (MAR)	13:28.63
2.	Domingos Castro (POR)	13:28.68
3.	Frank O'Mara (IRL)	13:28.79
4.	Sydney Maree (USA)	13:28.86
5.	Abel Antón (ESP)	13:28.92
6.	Tim Hutchings (GBR)	13:29.06
7.	Vincent Rousseau (BEL)	13:29.74
8.	Doug Padilla (USA)	13:30.16
9.	Markus Ryffel (SUI)	13:33.07
10.	Jonny Danielson (SWE)	13:35.69
11.	Zhang Guowei (CHN)	13:40.46
12.	Juma Mnyampanda (TAN)	13:42.57
13.	Kozu Akutsu (JPN)	13:46.29
14.	Omar Aguilar (CHI)	13:52.59
15.	Hugo Allan García (GUA)	14:08.72
16.	Miguel Vargas (CRC)	14:59.32
—	Salvatore Antibo (ITA)	DNS
—	Wodajo Bulti (ETH)	DNS

RANK	HEAT 2	TIME
1.	John Ngugi (KEN)	13:22.68 CR
2.	Dionisio Castro (POR)	13:23.12
3.	Pierre Délèze (SUI)	13:24.07
4.	Evgeni Ignatov (BUL)	13:24.42
5.	Jack Buckner (GBR)	13:24.56
6.	Steve Ovett (GBR)	13:28.68
7.	John Treacy (IRL)	13:28.89
8.	Carey Nelson (CAN)	13:29.20
9.	Haji Bulbula (ETH)	13:31.06
10.	Brahim Boutayeb (MAR)	13:32.73
11.	Herbert Stephan (FRG)	13:34.68
12.	Pascal Thiebaut (FRA)	13:38.97
13.	José Manuel Abascal (ESP)	13:59.68
14.	John Gregorek (USA)	14:01.02
15.	Thabiso Paul Moqhali (LES)	14:39.68
16.	Masini Situ-Kubanza (ZAI)	14:50.39
17.	Abdalla Washali (YEM)	15:42.10
18.	Atsou Amewouho (TOG)	16:16.41

== See also ==
- 1983 Men's World Championships 5,000 metres (Helsinki)
- 1984 Men's Olympic 5,000 metres (Los Angeles)
- 1986 Men's European Championships 5,000 metres (Stuttgart)
- 1988 Men's Olympic 5,000 metres (Seoul)
- 1990 Men's European Championships 5,000 metres (Split)
- 1991 Men's World Championships 5,000 metres (Tokyo)
