= 1985 IAAF World Indoor Games – Men's 3000 metres =

The men's 3000 metres event at the 1985 IAAF World Indoor Games was held at the Palais Omnisports Paris-Bercy on 18 and 19 January.

== Medalists ==
Gold	Silver	Bronze
João Campos; Portugal	Don Clary; United States	Ivan Uvizl; Czechoslovakia

== Results ==
=== Heats ===
First 4 of each heat (Q) and the next 3 fastest (q) qualified for the final.

Rank	Heat	Name	Nationality	Time	Notes
1	2	Christoph Herle	West Germany	7:54.54	Q
2	2	Dave Lewis	Great Britain	7:54.55	Q
3	2	Francis Gonzalez	France	7:54.73	Q
4	2	António Leitão	Portugal	7:54.82	Q, NR
5	2	Pierre Délèze	Switzerland	7:55.22	q
6	2	Bob Verbeeck	Belgium	7:55.94	q, PB
7	2	Ivan Uvizl	Czechoslovakia	7:57.78	q
8	2	Tony Rodgers	New Zealand	7:58.09	
9	1	João Campos	Portugal	7:59.07	Q
10	1	Stefano Mei	Italy	8:00.18	Q
11	1	Don Clary	United States	8:00.21	Q
12	1	Joseph Mahmoud	France	8:00.76	Q
13	1	Bruno Lafranchi	Switzerland	8:01.27	
14	1	Peter Renner	New Zealand	8:06.38	
15	1	Isaack Lubango	Tanzania	8:12.71	
16	2	Emilio Ulloa	Chile	8:19.96	
17	1	Julian Giraldo	Colombia	8:22.42	
18	2	Mohammed Bekheet	Palestine	8:23.63	NR
19	1	Yehezkel Khalifa	Israel	8:24.34	
20	1	Vinko Pokrajčić	Yugoslavia	8:36.04	

=== Final ===
Rank	Name	Nationality	Time	Notes
1st place, gold medalist(s)	João Campos	Portugal	7:57.63	
2nd place, silver medalist(s)	Don Clary	United States	7:57.78	
3rd place, bronze medalist(s)	Ivan Uvizl	Czechoslovakia	7:57.92	
4	António Leitão	Portugal	7:58.14	
5	Dave Lewis	Great Britain	7:58.19	
6	Francis Gonzalez	France	7:58.78	
7	Christoph Herle	West Germany	7:59.52	
8	Joseph Mahmoud	France	8:02.90	
9	Stefano Mei	Italy	8:03.01	
10	Pierre Délèze	Switzerland	8:10.51	
	Bob Verbeeck	Belgium	DNF	
