= 1986 European Athletics Championships – Men's 5000 metres =

Men's 5000 metres at the European Athletics Championships

These are the official results of the Men's 5,000 metres event at the 1986 European Championships in Stuttgart, West Germany, held at Neckarstadion on 28 and 31 August 1986. There were a total number of 28 participating athletes, with two qualifying heats.

== Medalists ==
Gold	Jack Buckner; United Kingdom
Silver	Stefano Mei; Italy
Bronze	Tim Hutchings; United Kingdom

== Final ==
This final was run mostly at a fast pace. The Italians, Britons and Portuguese tried some team tactics during the race. Italy's Salvatore Antibo led until about 500 metres, after which his famous teammate Alberto Cova took over. Both were clearly trying to help their teammate Stefano Mei, who had surprisingly defeated the defending champion Cova on the opening day, in the 10,000-metre race. Shortly after Cova had passed 1,000 metres in the lead in 2:39.04, Portugal's Fernando Couto accelerated to the front, to help his well-known teammate António Leitão, the defending Olympic bronze medalist at this distance. Couto was still leading at 2,000 metres in 5:19.72. Shortly thereafter, Cova passed Couto, who quickly drifted to the rear of the field, to join West Germany's Uwe Mönkemeyer, Czechoslovakia's Ivan Uvizl and Britain's Steve Ovett, who had apparently lost his best shape for the 1986 season. After his stunningly easy victory at the Commonwealth Games 5,000-metre race, Ovett had been considered a favourite also for the European Championships final. However, he had struggled to qualify for this final, and already during the first lap, he had drifted to the last place. After 2,300 metres, Leitão re-took the lead from Cova. Before 3,000 metres (which Leitão passed in 7:58.97), Ovett, Uvizl, Couto, Mönkemeyer and Antibo had dropped from the lead group. Exhausted, Ovett dropped out of the final altogether at 3,000 metres. The pace temporarily slowed down, with a couple of laps over 65 seconds. After 3,600 metres, Britain's Tim Hutchings went into the lead, and began to gradually improve the pace. His remaining teammate Jack Buckner followed well in contention. Surprisingly, the defending Olympic silver medalist at this distance, Switzerland's Markus Ryffel dropped out before 3,900 metres, while still in the lead group. After 3,900 metres, Belgium's Vincent Rousseau lost contact with the lead group. So tired out was the Belgian that he jogged the last 1,000 metres in over 3 minutes. Shortly after Hutchings had covered 4,000 metres in the lead, with a time of 10:42.20, Finland's Martti Vainio and Switzerland's Pierre Délèze dropped from the lead group. Before 4,300 metres, Cova also tired out, to the surprise of many spectators. Although Leitão passed Cova, he was unable to keep up with Hutchings, Buckner, Mei, and Bulgaria's Evgeni Ignatov. Buckner took the lead at 4,600 metres, with a split time of about 12:14. About 100 metres later, Ignatov dropped from the top group. Before 4,800 metres, Mei managed to pass Buckner. In the first half of the final bend, Hutchings dropped from Mei's pace, but in the second half of the bend, Buckner kicked past Mei. He widened his lead to almost 1.5 seconds, to win in a new European Championships record time of 13:10.15. Unofficially, he ran the last lap in 56.14 seconds. (See YouTube, user tommytempo1: Jack Buckner-European Athletics Championships 5,000m Final, Stuttgart 1986; tommytempo1: Steve Ovett Commonwealth 5000m 1986.)

Rank	Final	Time
	Jack Buckner (GBR)	13:10.15
	Stefano Mei (ITA)	13:11.57
	Tim Hutchings (GBR)	13:12.88
4.	Evgeni Ignatov (BUL)	13:13.15
5.	António Leitão (POR)	13:17.67
6.	Martti Vainio (FIN)	13:22.67
7.	Pierre Délèze (SUI)	13:28.80
8.	Alberto Cova (ITA)	13:35.86
9.	Ivan Uvizl (TCH)	13:37.26
10.	Salvatore Antibo (ITA)	13:38.25
11.	Uwe Mönkemeyer (FRG)	13:40.52
12.	Fernando Couto (POR)	13:42.39
13.	Vincent Rousseau (BEL)	13:51.69
—	Steve Ovett (GBR)	DNF
—	Markus Ryffel (SUI)	DNF

== Qualifying heats ==
Rank	Heat 1	Time
1.	Vincent Rousseau (BEL)	13:30.22
2.	Tim Hutchings (GBR)	13:30.40
3.	Stefano Mei (ITA)	13:30.63
4.	Markus Ryffel (SUI)	13:30.83
5.	Alberto Cova (ITA)	13:31.18
6.	Steve Ovett (GBR)	13:31.24
7.	Martti Vainio (FIN)	13:31.51
8.	Thomas Wessinghage (FRG)	13:33.98
9.	Eirik Hansen (NOR)	13:39.01
10.	Lubomír Tesáček (TCH)	13:39.70
11.	José Manuel Albentosa (ESP)	13:49.86
12.	Lars-Erik Nilsson (SWE)	13:52.76
13.	Necdet Ayaz (TUR)	14:02.08
	José Regalo (POR)	DNF
	Filippos Filippou (CYP)	DNF

Rank	Heat 2	Time
1.	Pierre Délèze (SUI)	13:28.61
2.	Evgeni Ignatov (BUL)	13:28.82
3.	Jack Buckner (GBR)	13:28.92
4.	Salvatore Antibo (ITA)	13:29.03
5.	António Leitão (POR)	13:29.10
6.	Uwe Mönkemeyer (FRG)	13:29.39
7.	Fernando Couto (POR)	13:29.63
8.	Ivan Uvizl (TCH)	13:31.92
9.	Abel Antón (ESP)	13:32.61
10.	Paul Donovan (IRL)	13:37.56
11.	Jonny Danielsson (SWE)	13:38.00
12.	Dieter Baumann (FRG)	13:44.22
13.	Bruno Lafranchi (SUI)	13:51.46

== Participation ==
According to an unofficial count, 28 athletes from 15 countries participated in the event.

- Belgium (1)
- Bulgaria (1)
- Cyprus (1)
- Czechoslovakia (2)
- Finland (1)
- Ireland (1)
- Italy (3)
- Norway (1)
- Portugal (3)
- Spain (2)
- Sweden (2)
- Switzerland (3)
- Turkey (1)
- United Kingdom (3)
- West Germany (3)

== See also ==
- 1982 Men's European Championships 5,000 metres (Athens)
- 1983 Men's World Championships 5,000 metres (Helsinki)
- 1984 Men's Olympic 5,000 metres (Los Angeles)
- 1987 Men's World Championships 5,000 metres (Rome)
- 1988 Men's Olympic 5,000 metres (Seoul)
- 1990 Men's European Championships 5,000 metres (Split)
