= Pascal Thiébaut =

French athletics competitor

Personal information
- Born: 5 June 1959 (age 67) Nancy, France
- Height: 1.75 m (5 ft 9 in)
- Weight: 60 kg (132 lb)

Sport
- Sport: Athletics
- Events: 1500 m, 5000 m
- Club: ASPTT Nancy

Pascal Thiébaut (born 5 June 1959) is a retired French athlete who competed in middle- and long-distance events. He was born in Nancy.He represented his country at the 1984 and 1988 Summer Olympics as well as two indoor and three outdoor World Championships. In addition he won the bronze medal at the 1987 European Indoor Championships.

== Competition record ==
Year	Competition	Venue	Position	Event	Notes
Representing France
1983	World Championships	Helsinki, Finland	22nd (h)	1500 m	3:41.51
1983	Mediterranean Games	Casablanca, Morocco	8th	1500 m	3:42.64
1984	Olympic Games	Los Angeles, United States	19th (sf)	1500 m	3:40.96
1986	European Championships	Stuttgart, West Germany	14th (h)	1500 m	3:40.81
1987	European Indoor Championships	Liévin, France	3rd	3000 m	7:54.03
1987	World Indoor Championships	Indianapolis, United States	7th	3000 m	8:08.82
1987	World Championships	Rome, Italy	22nd (h)	5000 m	13:38.97
1988	Olympic Games	Seoul, South Korea	11th	5000 m	13:31.99
1990	European Championships	Split, Yugoslavia	26th (h)	5000 m	14:07.13
1991	World Indoor Championships	Seville, Spain	6th	3000 m	7:47.51
1991	World Championships	Tokyo, Japan	23rd (h)	1500 m	3:45.18
1993	Mediterranean Games	Narbonne, France	4th	1500 m	3:38.25
1994	European Indoor Championships	Paris, France	21st (h)	3000 m	8:18.55

== Personal bests ==
Outdoor

- 800 meters – 1:47.1 (St-Maur 1984)
- 1000 meters – 2:17.71 (Anneville 1985)
- 1500 meters – 3:34.08 (Monaco 1992)
- One mile – 3:52.02 (Oslo 1984)
- 3000 meters – 7:42.64 (Villeneuve d'Ascq 1989)
- 5000 meters – 13:14.60 (Oslo 1987)

Indoor

- 1500 meters – 3:42.48 (Liévin 1987)
- 3000 meters – 7:47.51 (Seville 1991)
