= Athletics at the 1989 Summer Universiade – Men's 5000 metres =

The men's 5000 metres event at the 1989 Summer Universiade was held at the Wedaustadion in Duisburg on 28 and 30 August 1989.

== Medalists ==
Gold	Silver	Bronze
Stefano Mei; Italy	Charles Cheruiyot; Kenya	Antonio Serrano; Spain

== Results ==
=== Heats ===
Rank	Heat	Athlete	Nationality	Time	Notes
1	2	Khalid Skah	Morocco	13:53.60	Q
2	2	Walter Merlo	Italy	13:57.72	Q
3	2	Steffen Brand	West Germany	13:58.60	Q
4	2	John Nuttall	Great Britain	13:58.82	Q
5	2	Lars-Erik Nilsson	Sweden	13:59.03	Q
6	2	Kimama Kibiri	Kenya	13:59.21	q
7	1	Charles Cheruiyot	Kenya	14:03.37	Q
8	2	John Castellano	Canada	14:04.01	q
9	1	Stefano Mei	Italy	14:04.70	Q
10	1	Richard Nerurkar	Great Britain	14:04.83	Q
11	1	Antonio Serrano	Spain	14:04.98	Q
12	1	Darren Klassen	Canada	14:05.00	Q
13	1	Jim Farmer	United States	14:05.33	q
14	1	Truls Nygaard	Norway	14:07.35	q
15	2	Matt Giusto	United States	14:07.80	q
16	2	Nikolay Chameyev	Soviet Union	14:08.22	
17	1	Zeki Öztürk	Turkey	14:08.99	
18	2	Baek Seung-do	South Korea	14:13.03	
19	1	Salvador Parra	Mexico	14:16.98	
20	1	Azzedine Sakhri	Algeria	14:24.04	
21	2	Paulo Ferreira	Portugal	14:25.00	
22	1	Andrey Tikhonov	Soviet Union	14:31.72	
23	2	Noel Richardson	Ireland	14:36.31	
24	2	Ibrahim Elmi	Somalia	15:39.07	
25	1	Albert Budoni	Tanzania	16:09.77	
26	1	Moses Twesige-Omne	Uganda	16:20.64	
27	1	Abdoulaye Djibril	Guinea	16:27.87	
28	2	Oumar Diallo	Guinea	17:36.08	
	1	Klaus Heiserer	West Germany	DNF	
	1	Peter Fallenius	Sweden	DNF	

=== Final ===
Rank	Athlete	Nationality	Time	Notes
1st place, gold medalist(s)	Stefano Mei	Italy	13:39.04	
2nd place, silver medalist(s)	Charles Cheruiyot	Kenya	13:39.42	
3rd place, bronze medalist(s)	Antonio Serrano	Spain	13:39.50	
4	John Nuttall	Great Britain	13:39.80	
5	Lars-Erik Nilsson	Sweden	13:39.80	
6	Khalid Skah	Morocco	13:52.55	
7	John Castellano	Canada	13:54.86	
8	Jim Farmer	United States	13:55.85	
9	Kimama Kibiri	Kenya	13:56.90	
10	Steffen Brand	West Germany	14:00.41	
11	Darren Klassen	Canada	14:00.69	
12	Richard Nerurkar	Great Britain	14:03.07	
13	Walter Merlo	Italy	14:27.60	
14	Truls Nygaard	Norway	14:44.37	
	Matt Giusto	United States	DNF	
