= Athletics at the 1988 Summer Olympics – Men's 5000 metres =

Men's 5000 metres at the Games of the XXIV Olympiad
- Venue: Olympic Stadium
- Dates: 28 September 1988 (heats); 29 September 1988 (semi-finals); 1 October 1988 (final)
- Competitors: 56 from 39 nations
- Winning time: 13:11.70

Medalists
1st place, gold medalist(s)		John Ngugi; Kenya
2nd place, silver medalist(s)		Dieter Baumann; West Germany
3rd place, bronze medalist(s)		Hansjörg Kunze; East Germany

The Men's 5000 metres at the 1988 Summer Olympics in Seoul, South Korea had an entry list of 56 competitors, with three qualifying heats (56) and two semifinals (30) before the final (15) took place on Saturday October 1, 1988.

The race started off tactically, with Stefano Mei taking the point for a slow first lap, then Evgeni Ignatov accelerating for a faster second lap. 900 metres into the race, John Ngugi went all in, coming from the back of the pack, passing the field and dropping a sub-60 lap. The field scrambled and strung out in chase but soon he had a 15-metre gap. Another 61 second lap and he had 30 metres. Ngugi slowed to a more rational pace, but still have a 40-metre breakaway on the peloton, led by John Doherty. With five and a half laps to go, Domingos Castro went around Doherty to lead the effort to bridge the gap. Castro's move strung out the pack, as Castro separated himself from the other chasers and closed down on Ngugi's gap. Castro eventually had a larger gap on the pack than Ngugi had on him, at the bell six seconds on the leader of the pack who was now Dieter Baumann. Ngugi began to widen his gap on Castro and trotted home to the win unchallenged. Behind Castro, Baumann and Hansjörg Kunze were sprinting in a battle for bronze. 30 metres from the finish, Baumann caught the exhausted Castro. Five metres before the finish, Kunze also sprinted past Castro, both (West and East respectively) German runners running about a 56-second last lap.

== Medalists ==
Gold	John Ngugi; Kenya
Silver	Dieter Baumann; West Germany
Bronze	Hansjörg Kunze; East Germany

== Records ==
These were the standing world and Olympic records (in minutes) prior to the 1988 Summer Olympics.

World record	12:58.39	(Morocco) Saïd Aouita	Rome (ITA)	July 22, 1987
Olympic record	13:05.59	(Morocco) Saïd Aouita	Los Angeles (USA)	August 11, 1984

== Final ==
RANK	FINAL	TIME
	John Ngugi (KEN)	13:11.70
	Dieter Baumann (FRG)	13:15.52
	Hansjörg Kunze (GDR)	13:15.73
4.	Domingos Castro (POR)	13:16.09
5.	Sydney Maree (USA)	13:23.69
6.	Jack Buckner (GBR)	13:23.85
7.	Stefano Mei (ITA)	13:26.17
8.	Evgeni Ignatov (BUL)	13:26.41
9.	John Doherty (IRL)	13:27.71
10.	Jonny Danielsson (SWE)	13:30.44
11.	Pascal Thiebaut (FRA)	13:31.99
12.	Yobes Ondieki (KEN)	13:52.01
13.	Gary Staines (GBR)	13:55.00
14.	Paul Arpin (FRA)	14:13.19
–	José Regalo (POR)	DNF

== Non-qualifiers ==
- Eliminated in the semi-finals

RANK	SEMIFINALS	TIME
16.	Salvatore Antibo (ITA)	13:25.64
17.	Eamonn Martin (GBR)	13:26.26
18.	Cyril Laventure (FRA)	13:29.92
19.	Mauricio González (MEX)	13:32.52
20.	Doug Padilla (USA)	13:37.11
21.	Charles Cheruiyot (KEN)	13:38.44
22.	Abel Antón (ESP)	13:39.13
23.	Alejandro Gómez (ESP)	13:41.73
24.	Andrew Lloyd (AUS)	13:42.49
25.	Mikhail Dasko (URS)	13:43.65
26.	Paul Williams (CAN)	13:44.57
27.	Marcos Barreto (MEX)	13:53.93
28.	Eamon Coghlan (IRL)	14:02.16
29.	Vincent Rousseau (BEL)	14:03.74
30.	Terry Brahm (USA)	14:04.12

=== Eliminated in the heats ===
RANK	HEATS	TIME
	Dietmar Millonig (AUT)	14:01.92
	Pierre Délèze (SUI)	14:12.79
	Carey Nelson (CAN)	14:15.94
	Aboukar Hassan Adani (SOM)	14:37.98
	Ismael Hassan (DJI)	14:45.40
	Hari Bahadur Rokaya (NEP)	14:53.75
	Kaleka Mutoke (COD)	14:56.33
	Ian Gray (BIZ)	15:33.24
	Abdel Rahman Massad (SUD)	15:50.91
	Manuel Rondo (GEQ)	16:44.33
	Fernando Couto (POR)	13:58.72
	Arturo Barrios (MEX)	13:59.04
	Frank O'Mara (IRL)	13:59.46
	Shuichi Yoneshige (JPN)	13:59.68
	Stanley Mandebele (ZIM)	14:03.97
	Kim Yeong-gil (KOR)	14:09.45
	Eduardus Nabunome (INA)	14:19.40
	George Mambosasa (MAW)	14:30.01
	Anwar Al-Harazi (YAR)	14:49.25
	Mohamed Ould Khalifa (MTN)	15:18.64
	Lars Ove Strømø (NOR)	DNF
	Juma Mnyampanda (TAN)	14:05.09
	Ahmed Ibrahim Warsama (QAT)	14:06.20
	Mathias Ntawulikura (RWA)	14:08.84
	Farouk Ahmed Sayed (YMD)	15:11.20
	Ronodji Niakaken (CHA)	15:42.73

== See also ==
- 1987 Men's World Championships 5.000 metres (Rome)
- 1990 Men's European Championships 5.000 metres (Split)
- 1991 Men's World Championships 5.000 metres (Tokyo)
- 1992 Men's Olympic 5.000 metres (Barcelona)
