= Uwe Mönkemeyer =

German athletics competitor (born 1959)

Personal information
- Born: 22 September 1959 (age 66) Holzminden, West Germany
- Height: 1.80 m (5 ft 11 in)

Sport
- Sport: Athletics
- Events: 1500 m, 3000 m, 5000 m
- Club: TV Wattenscheid

Uwe Mönkemeyer (born 22 September 1959, in Holzminden) is a German former middle- and long-distance runner. He represented West Germany in the 5000 metres at the 1984 Summer Olympics reaching the semifinals. In addition, he won the bronze medal in the 3000 metres at the 1983 European Indoor Championships.

At the West German championships, in the 1500 metres, Mönkemeyer won the bronze medal in 1983 and gold medal in 1986. He became indoor champion in the same event in 1986 and 1987, and West German indoor champion in the 3000 metres in 1983 (winning the bronze in 1984). He represented the club TV Wattenscheid.

== International competitions ==
Year	Competition	Venue	Position	Event	Notes
Representing West Germany
1983	European Indoor Championships	Budapest, Hungary	3rd	3000 m	7:58.11
1984	European Indoor Championships	Gothenburg, Sweden	4th	3000 m	7:55.78
1984	Olympic Games	Los Angeles, United States	19th (h)	5000 m	13:48.66^{1}
1986	European Indoor Championships	Madrid, Spain	4th	1500 m	3:46.47
1986	European Championships	Stuttgart, West Germany	11th	5000 m	13:40.52
1987	European Indoor Championships	Liévin, France	12th (h)	1500 m	3:50.16
1987	World Indoor Championships	Indianapolis, United States	10th	3000 m	8:12.41

^{1}Did not finish in the semifinals

== Personal bests ==
Outdoor

- 800 metres – 1:48.28 (Ahlen 1983)
- 1000 metres – 2:18.76 (Lage 1986)
- 1500 metres – 3:35.26 (Cologne 1986)
- One mile – 3:55.84 (Berlin 1986)
- 3000 metres – 7:49.86 (Hannover 1984)
- 5000 metres – 13:21.14 (Koblenz 1986)

Indoor

- 1500 metres – 3:45.58 (Madrid 1986)
- 3000 metres – 7:55.39 (Indianapolis 1987)
