= Terry Brahm =

American former long-distance runner

Personal information
- Born: November 21, 1962 (age 63) Saint Meinrad, Indiana, United States

Sport
- Sport: Long-distance running
Medal record
Representing United States
Goodwill Games
Silver medal – second place	1986 Moscow	5000 m
World Indoor Championships
Bronze medal – third place	1987 Indianapolis	3000 m

Terrence Paul Brahm (born November 21, 1962) is an American former long-distance runner. He was the bronze medalist in the 3000 meters at the IAAF World Indoor Championships in 1987 and represented the United States in the 5000 meters at the 1988 Seoul Olympics. He was the 1986 NCAA champion in that event for the Indiana Hoosiers.

== Career ==
He grew up in Saint Meinrad, Indiana and attended Heritage Hills High School in Lincoln City, Indiana. He revealed his athletic talent in the Pocket Athletic Conference while there. He attended Indiana University Bloomington and competed for their Indiana Hoosiers college track team while there. He won both the mile run and two miles titles at the 1984 Big Ten Conference indoor championships and was named the Athlete of the meet. He took the highest collegiate honour in 1986, winning the 5000 meters title at the NCAA Men's Outdoor Track and Field Championships. This made him the institution's second athlete to win that race, building on the achievement of 1936's inaugural winner Don Lash.

Brahm began to break through in senior competitions in 1986, first with a 5000 m runner-up finish at the 1986 USA Outdoor Track and Field Championships behind Doug Padilla, then a silver medal in the same event at the Goodwill Games (again behind Padilla). Brahm took the 3000 meters bronze medal at the 1987 IAAF World Indoor Championships, held in his home state in Indianapolis, finishing behind Irish duo Frank O'Mara and Paul Donovan. He finished third at the USA Outdoor Championships in 1987 and improved to the runner-up spot for a second time in 1988 at the USA Olympic Trials to claim a spot on the American team for the 1988 Summer Olympics.

On Brahm's Olympic debut he reached the semi-finals of the 5000 m, but managed only fifteenth in that race. Before retiring, he won two national titles: the United States 5K Run Championships in 1990 and the 3000 m at the United States Indoor Track and Field Championships in 1991.

== Personal records ==
- 1500 meters – 3:35.81 min (1988)
- Mile run – 3:54.56 min (1984)
- 3000 meters – 7:43.15 min (1986)
- 3000 meters (indoor) – 7:46.09 min (1989)
- Two miles – 8:21.18 min (1988)
- 5000 meters – 13:28.00 min (1990)

All information from Tilastopaja

== Collegiate titles ==
- Mile run - Big Ten Indoor Champion (1984)
- Two miles - Big Ten Indoor Champion (1984)
- 5000 meters - NCAA Outdoor Champion (1986)

== National titles ==
- United States 5K Run Championships
  - 5K: 1990
- United States Indoor Track and Field Championships
  - 3000 meters: 1991

== International competitions ==
Year	Competition	Venue	Position	Event	Notes
1986	Goodwill Games	Moscow, Soviet Union	2nd	5000 m	3:47.11
1987	World Indoor Championships	Indianapolis, United States	3rd	3000 m	8:03.92
1988	Olympic Games	Seoul, South Korea	15th (semis)	5000 m	14:04.12
