= Kim Yeong-gil (disambiguation) =

Kim Yeong-gil (born 1965) is a South Korean long-distance runner.

Kim Yeong-gil or Kim Yŏng-gil (Korean: 김영길) may also refer to:

- Kim Young-gil (born 1939), South Korean materials engineer
- Kim Yung-kil (born 1944), North Korean footballer
