= 1986 European Athletics Indoor Championships – Men's 3000 metres =

The men's 3000 metres event at the 1986 European Athletics Indoor Championships was held on 22 and 23 February.

== Medalists ==
Gold	Silver	Bronze
Dietmar Millonig; Austria	Stefano Mei; Italy	João Campos; Portugal

== Results ==
=== Heats ===
First 3 of each heat (Q) and the next 3 fastest (q) qualified for the final.

Rank	Heat	Name	Nationality	Time	Notes
1	1	Thomas Wessinghage	West Germany	8:01.01	Q
2	1	António Leitão	Portugal	8:01.13	Q
3	2	Walter Merlo	Italy	8:01.14	Q
4	1	Dietmar Millonig	Austria	8:01.46	Q
5	1	Stefano Mei	Italy	8:01.50	Q
6	1	João Campos	Portugal	8:02.20	q
7	2	Gábor Szabó	Hungary	8:02.55	Q
8	2	Mark Roberts	Great Britain	8:03.35	Q
9	1	Lubomír Tesáček	Czechoslovakia	8:03.53	q
10	2	Czesław Mojżysz	Poland	8:04.10	Q
11	1	Billy Dee	Great Britain	8:04.11	q
12	2	Abel Antón	Spain	8:05.09	q
13	2	Peter Belger	West Germany	8:14.84	
14	2	José Regalo	Portugal	8:16.52	
15	2	José Manuel Abascal	Spain	8:17.33	
16	1	Jaime López	Spain	8:21.23	
17	1	Yorgos Petrakis	Greece	8:22.22	
18	2	Panayotis Fotiou	Greece	8:49.97	
	2	Luboš Gaisl	Czechoslovakia	DNF	

=== Final ===
Rank	Name	Nationality	Time	Notes
1st place, gold medalist(s)	Dietmar Millonig	Austria	7:59.08	
2nd place, silver medalist(s)	Stefano Mei	Italy	7:59.12	
3rd place, bronze medalist(s)	João Campos	Portugal	7:59.15	
4	Gábor Szabó	Hungary	7:59.99	
5	Thomas Wessinghage	West Germany	8:00.76	
6	Walter Merlo	Italy	8:03.29	
7	António Leitão	Portugal	8:03.43	
8	Lubomír Tesáček	Czechoslovakia	8:04.74	
9	Abel Antón	Spain	8:09.31	
10	Billy Dee	Great Britain	8:14.61	
11	Czesław Mojżysz	Poland	8:20.16	
	Mark Roberts	Great Britain	DNF	
