= Athletics at the 1985 Summer Universiade – Men's 10,000 metres =

The men's 10,000 metres event at the 1985 Summer Universiade was held at the Kobe Universiade Memorial Stadium in Kobe on 29 August 1985.

== Results ==
Rank	Athlete	Nationality	Time	Notes
1st place, gold medalist(s)	Keith Brantly	United States	29:11.24	
2nd place, silver medalist(s)	Jesús Herrera	Mexico	29:11.71	
3rd place, bronze medalist(s)	Shuichi Yoneshige	Japan	29:11.73	
4	Salvatore Nicosia	Italy	29:21.75	
5	Satoshi Kato	Japan	29:24.95	
6	Michael Schyett	West Germany	29:32.78	
7	Rafael Marques	Portugal	29:37.34	
8	Dave Morrison	United States	29:37.99	
9	Peter Butler	Canada	29:44.54	
10	Emmanuel Handzos	Greece	29:45.86	
11	Pablo Martín	Spain	29:46.72	
12	Mark Scrutton	Great Britain	29:49.45	
13	Luís Horta	Portugal	29:56.59	
14	Larbi El-Mouadden	Morocco	30:04.27	
15	Steve Moneghetti	Australia	30:13.33	
16	Rheal Desjardins	Canada	30:57.87	
17	Mohamed Salmi	Algeria	30:58.67	
18	K. Tucker	Zimbabwe	33:43.26	
19	P. Miti	Kenya	33:54.07	
	Walter Merlo	Italy	DNF	
	Argimiro Domínguez	Spain	DNF	
	Alan Guilder	Great Britain	DNF	
