= Adam Ciołkosz =

Polish politician (1902–1978)

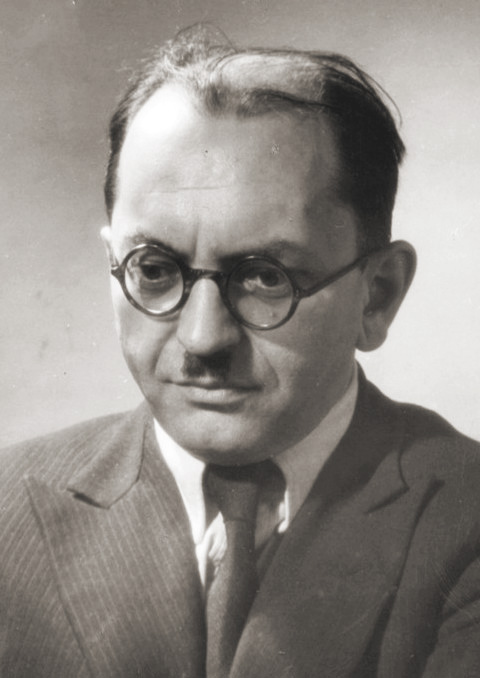
- Born: 5 January 1902; Kraków, Austrian Galicia
- Died: 1 October 1978 (aged 76); London, England
- Occupation: Politician
- Known for: Leaders of Polish Socialist Party

Adam Ciołkosz (Polish: [ˈadam ˈt͡ɕɔwkɔʂ]; 5 January 1901 – 1 October 1978) was a Polish scout, soldier, publicist and politician, who was one of the most important leaders of the Polish Socialist Party, both in the Second Polish Republic and in exile during and after World War II.

== Early life and education ==
Ciołkosz was born in Kraków, but a year later his family moved to Tarnów. His father, Kasper, was an active progressive and independence agitator. His mother, Maria Idzikowska, was the daughter of a veteran of the January Uprising. He graduated from a Gymnasium in Tarnów and later studied law at the Jagiellonian University. While a student, Ciołkosz became a member of the socialist movement.

== Scouting and fighting for independence ==
In Gymnasium, Ciołkosz joined 1st Scouts Squad, "Zawisza Czarny". Later, he was a founder and organizer of scouting in Zakopane. During World War I, he lived in Vienna and was still active. In October 1918, he and the National Emergency Squads of the Polish Scouts, which he had formed and led with POWs, forced Austrian forces to surrender in Tarnów. In November, he was one of the young scouts who participated in the battle for Lwów. In 1919, Ciołkosz was promoted to a junior lieutenant. He was also an organiser of the Polish scouting movement in Warmia and Mazury and fought during Silesian Uprising.

== Political career ==
In 1928, he was elected a Sejm Member from the Polish Socialist Party. He was re-elected in 1930, but this time Sanacja authorities didn't allow him to take office, as with many others of the opposition.

He was one of the most outspoken critics of the Sanacja regime and was tried and sentenced to three years in prison during Brest trials in 1931 for plotting an anti-government coup. After the German invasion into Poland in 1939, Ciołkosz, his wife Lidia Kahan (who was of Jewish descent and also a prominent socialist from Jagiellonian University), and son Andrzej Ciołkosz fled first to Romania, and later to France and England. His son, a translator of Herling, died at the age of 23 in 1952.

Ciołkosz was an active politician in exile and soon was elected as party leader. He led PPS in exile until his death in London. A strong anti-Stalinist, he opposed Soviet domination in Eastern Europe after 1945. His wife died in 2002 at the age of 99.
