= Paul Donovan (athlete) =

Irish long-distance runner

Medal record

Men's athletics

Representing Ireland

World Indoor Championships
Silver medal – second place	1987 Indianapolis	3000 m

Paul Donovan (athlete) (born 11 July 1963) is an Irish former long-distance runner. He was the silver medallist in the 3000 metres at the 1987 IAAF World Indoor Championships. He was the number one ranked indoor runner that year. He represented Ireland at the Olympics twice: in 1984 and again in 1992.

Donovan was a three-time NCAA champion with the Arkansas Razorbacks. He also competed for Ireland at the European Athletics Championships in 1986 and at the 1993 IAAF World Indoor Championships. He twice ran as a junior at the IAAF World Cross Country Championships.

== Career ==
Donovan grew up in Galway and took part in sports at high school, mainly being involved in Gaelic football, soccer, and rugby. However, while training for Gaelic football he found a gift for long-distance running. He made his international debut at the 1979 IAAF World Cross Country Championships staged on home soil in Limerick, running in the junior race and placing 54th. He won the intermediate section of the British Schools Cross Country International that year, as well as running in the 3000 metres heats at the 1979 European Athletics Junior Championships. His last major junior appearance was a run at the 1981 IAAF World Cross Country Championships, where he improved to 18th place and led the Irish junior team to eighth in the rankings.

He enrolled at the University of Arkansas on an athletic scholarship and began competing for Irish coach John McDonnell's Arkansas Razorbacks team – among the country's best college track teams at that time. He placed tenth at the 1983 NCAA Division I Cross Country Championships. Donovan made his Olympic debut at the 1984 Los Angeles Olympics, but failed to make it through past the first round of the 1500 metres. His greatest success came at the NCAA Men's Indoor Track and Field Championships. He won his first title there over 1500 m in 1985, then scored a 3000 m and distance medley relay double at the 1986 championships. Both seasons the Razorbacks won the team title. Among his teammates was Mike Conley, who had won the Olympic triple jump silver in 1984.

He completed college in 1986 and began focusing in international competitions. He represented Ireland at the 1986 European Athletics Championships, but did not progress beyond the 5000 metres heats. His career peak came during the 1987 indoor season. A lifetime best run of 7:47.95 minutes was the best by any 3000 m athlete in the world that year. This set him up as a strong contender for the 3000 m title at the 1987 IAAF World Indoor Championships. A tactically run final saw a close finish and he took the silver medal narrowly behind fellow Irishman Frank O'Mara, and just three hundredths ahead of bronze medallist Terry Brahm. However, a knee injury interrupted his career at this point and he did not reach such peaks again.

After returning from injury in 1990, he made the grade for Ireland at the 1992 Summer Olympics and in the Olympic 5000 metres he competed in the heats only. He was the Irish champion in that distance in both 1990 and 1993. He was also the 1992 runner-up in the 1500 m at the AAA Indoor Championships. His final major international outings came in 1993. He returned to the venue of his sole medal at the 1993 IAAF World Indoor Championships, but failed to make the final. He qualified for the 1993 IAAF Grand Prix Final, but did not manage to finish the race.

After his retirement, he was inducted into the Arkansas Razorbacks Hall of Fame in 1998.

== Personal bests ==
- 1500 metres – 3:38.31 min (1984)
- 1500 metres indoor – 3:41.39 min (1985)
- Mile run – 3:55.82 min (1984)
- Mile run indoor – 3:56.39 min (1986)
- 3000 metres – 7:59.16 min (1993)
- 3000 metres indoor – 7:47.95 min (1987)
- 5000 metres – 13:23.16 min (1992)

Information on personal bests from IAAF profile and Tilastopaja.

== National titles ==
- Irish Athletics Championships
  - 5000 metres: 1990, 1993
- NCAA Men's Indoor Track and Field Championships
  - 1500 metres: 1985
  - 3000 metres: 1986
  - Distance medley relay: 1986
  - Team title: 1985, 1986

== International competitions ==
Year	Competition	Venue	Position	Event	Notes
1979	World Cross Country Championships	Limerick, Ireland	54th	Junior race	24:34
1979	World Cross Country Championships	Limerick, Ireland	4th	Junior team	90 pts
1979	European Junior Championships	Bydgoszcz, Poland	10th (heats)	3000 m	8:33.65
1981	World Cross Country Championships	Madrid, Spain	18th	Junior race	22:56
1981	World Cross Country Championships	Madrid, Spain	8th	Junior team	137 pts
1984	Olympic Games	Los Angeles, United States	4th (heats)	1500 m	3:45.70
1986	European Championships	Stuttgart, West Germany	10th (heats)	5000 m	13:37.56
1987	World Indoor Championships	Indianapolis, United States	2nd	3000 m	8:03.39
1992	Olympic Games	Barcelona, Spain	10th (heats)	5000 m	14:03.79
1993	World Indoor Championships	Toronto, Canada	8th (heats)	3000 m	8:03.69
1993	IAAF Grand Prix Final	London, United Kingdom	—	5000 m	DNF

Sporting positions
Preceded by Stefano Mei	Men's indoor 3000 m season's best performance 1987	Succeeded by Brian Abshire
