= America's Ekiden =

International relay race in 1988 and 1989

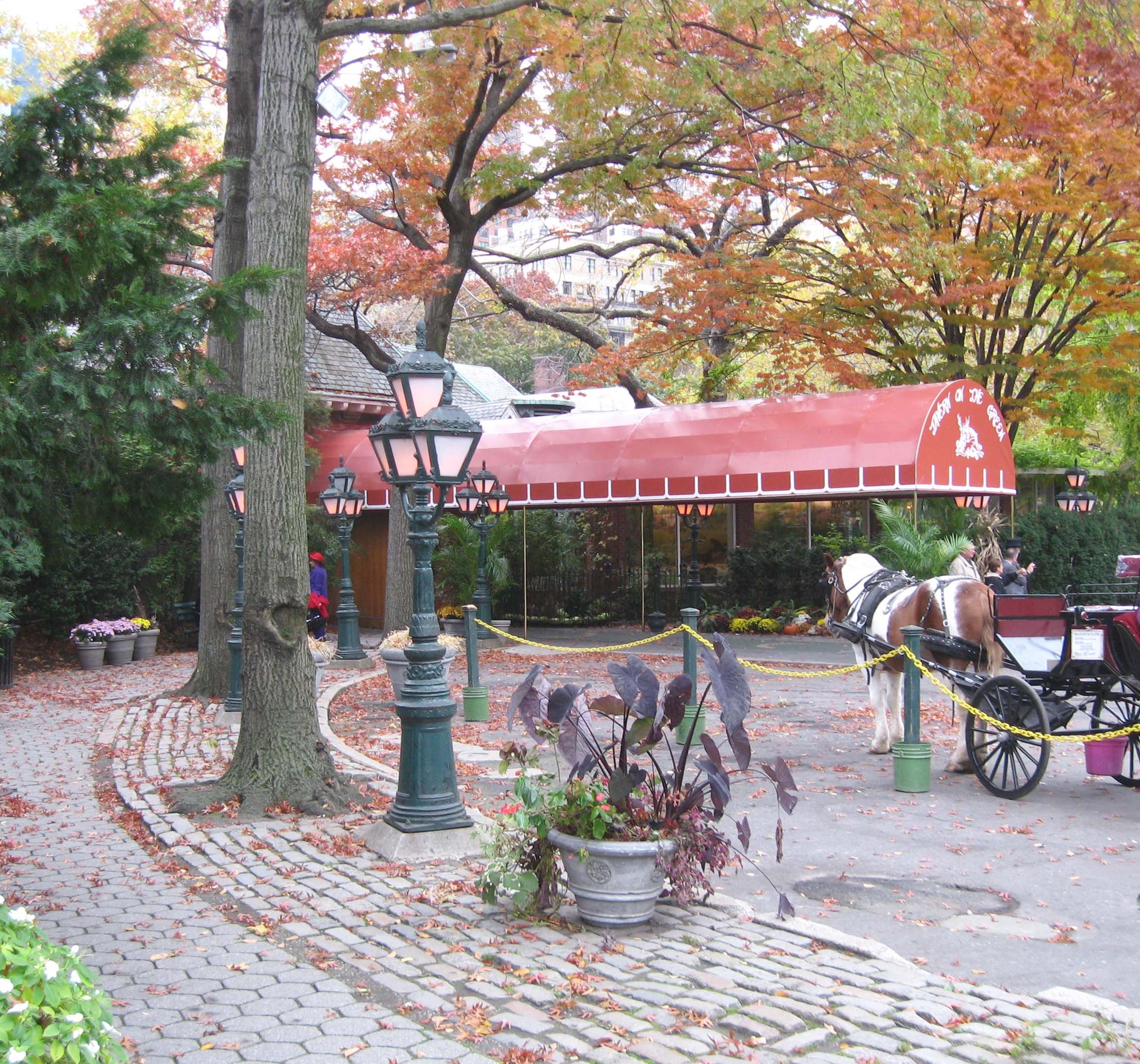
Tavern on the Green, where the race finished

America's Ekiden, also known as the Asics Cup America's Ekiden or the New York Ekiden, was an international men's ekiden (marathon relay race) held in New York City in 1988 and 1989. Said to be the first Ekiden ever held outside of Japan, it consisted of five-person teams from all 50 U.S. states plus a nation-wide U.S. team against seven other countries.

== History ==
In February 1988, athletes Steve Scott and Mark Curp were first announced to headline the inaugural America's Ekiden to be held on 9 April of that year over a distance of 50 kilometres (31 miles). It was said to be the first Ekiden ever held outside of Japan, and featured $215,000 (equivalent to $571,619 in 2024) in prize money. The course would start at the headquarters of the United Nations and run through Brooklyn and Queens before ending outside Tavern on the Green.

There were 305 runners at the first edition, which was held during windy and cold conditions. The early start time was coordinated to align with prime time in Japan. There were 53 domestic teams, including all 50 U.S. states plus teams representing Washington, D.C., New York City, and an overall U.S. team. The all-star U.S. team finished 2nd behind Ireland, but ahead of Great Britain in 3rd and the Soviet Union in 4th. The California team was the first non-national team to finish in 5th.

The second edition was run on a modified course that was 42 kilometres (closer to the marathon distance) rather than 50 km. It was again won by Ireland over the U.S. in what was described as soggy conditions.

There have been various attempts to host ekidens in New York City since, including the NYCRuns New York City Ekiden beginning in 2012 and the unsanctioned East River Ekiden over 50K in 2024.

== Winners ==
America's Ekiden winning teams
Ed.	Date	Athletes	Split	Team	Time	Ref
1st	9 April 1988	Marcus O'Sullivan	13:55	Ireland	2:25:12 (50 km)	
1st	9 April 1988	Frank O'Mara	23:03	Ireland	2:25:12 (50 km)	
1st	9 April 1988	Roy Dooney	36:41	Ireland	2:25:12 (50 km)	
1st	9 April 1988	John Treacy	42:48	Ireland	2:25:12 (50 km)	
1st	9 April 1988	John Doherty	28:47	Ireland	2:25:12 (50 km)	
2nd	9 April 1989	Marcus O'Sullivan	13:47	Ireland	1:58:20 (42 km)	
2nd	9 April 1989	John Treacy	30:28	Ireland	1:58:20 (42 km)	
2nd	9 April 1989	Gerry Curtis	26:17	Ireland	1:58:20 (42 km)	
2nd	9 April 1989	Frank O'Mara	20:00	Ireland	1:58:20 (42 km)	
2nd	9 April 1989	John Doherty	27:50	Ireland	1:58:20 (42 km)	

== Stage bests ==
Best stage times per year
Year	Stage 1			Stage 2			Stage 3			Stage 4			Stage 5		
Year	Distance	Best time	Athlete	Distance	Best time	Athlete	Distance	Best time	Athlete	Distance	Best time	Athlete	Distance	Best time	Athlete
1988	5 km	13:52	Steve Scott (USA)	8 km	23:00	John Gregorek (USA)	12 km	36:25	Pat Porter (USA)	15 km	42:48	John Treacy (IRL)	10 km	28:47	John Doherty (IRL)
1989	5 km	13:35	Steve Scott (USA)	10.8 km	30:28	John Treacy (IRL)	9.3 km	26:17	Gerry Curtis (IRL)	7.1 km	19:49	Keith Brantly (USA)	10 km	27:50	John Doherty (IRL)
