= 1981 European Athletics Indoor Championships – Men's 3000 metres =

The men's 3000 metres event at the 1981 European Athletics Indoor Championships was held on 22 February. The race was stopped one lap short, so the actual distance run was 2820 metres.

== Results ==
Rank	Name	Nationality	Time	Notes
1st place, gold medalist(s)	Alexandre Gonzalez	France	9:01	
2nd place, silver medalist(s)	Evgeni Ignatov	Bulgaria	9:02	
3rd place, bronze medalist(s)	Valeriy Abramov	Soviet Union	9:03	
4	Francis Gonzalez	France	9:04	
5	Christoph Herle	West Germany	9:05	
6	Robert Nemeth	Austria	9:06	
7	Lubomír Tesáček	Czechoslovakia	9:07	
8	Didier Chauvelier	France	9:08	
9	Jef Gees	Belgium	9:09	
10	Ken Newton	Great Britain	9:10	
11	Nikolaos Chalatzis	Greece	9:11	
