= Diomede Cishahayo =

Burundian long-distance runner

Diomede Cishahayo (born 15 September 1965) is a retired long distance Burundian runner.

== Career ==
He finished eighth in the 5000 metres at the 1989 Jeux de la Francophonie and competed in the 3000 metres at the 1991 World Indoor Championships without reaching the final. He competed, and finished lowly, at the 1991 World Cross Country Championships, the 1992 World Cross Country Championships and the 1993 World Half Marathon Championships.

His personal best times were 7:50.22 minutes in the 3000 metres, achieved in July 1991 in Rome; 13:41.6 minutes in the 5000 metres, achieved in July 1993 in San Giovanni Valdarno; and 28:14.80 minutes in the 10,000 metres, achieved in June 1996 in Domodossola. In road races he had 1:01:43 hours in the half marathon, in January 1997 in Marrakesh (a Burundian record; and 2:23:37 hours in the marathon, in December 1999 in Assisi.
