= Valeriy Abramov =

Soviet long-distance runner (1956–2016)

Personal information
- Born: 14 September 1956 Yertsevo, Arkhangelsk Oblast, Soviet Union
- Died: 14 September 2016 (aged 60) Moscow, Russia

Sport
- Sport: Track and field
Medal record
Representing Soviet Union
European Indoor Championships
Silver medal – second place	1983 Budapest	3000 m
Bronze medal – third place	1981 Grenoble	3000 m
Bronze medal – third place	1982 Milan	3000 m

Valeriy Aleksandrovich Abramov (22 August 1956 – 14 September 2016) was a long-distance runner from the Soviet Union. Honoured master of sports of USSR. He trained under the direction of Leonid Beliaev (Honoured coach of the USSR and Russia). He competed in the men's 5000 metres at the 1980 Summer Olympics.

Abramov was born in Yertsevo, Arkhangelsk Oblast and died in Moscow.

== Career ==
Eleven-time champion of the USSR: 1976 – 1500 m (juniors); 1978 – 1500 m, 4 × 800 m (relay race), 3000 m (hall); 1979 – 5000 m; 1981 – 3000 m (hall), 8000 m (cross); 1982 – 3000 m (hall), 1983 – 1500 m, 3000 m (hall); 1987 - 10,000 m.

Winner of the Spartakiad of Peoples of the USSR in 1979 at the distance of 5000 meters.

In 1981 he won the USA-USSR match, representing the USSR national team.

In 1984 at Friendship Games (the Druzhba-84) tournament (an alternative to the Summer Olympic Games in 1984 in Los Angeles), he won the 10,000 meters distance with a result 27:55.17.

He set up several records of the USSR: 1979 – 5000 m (result - 13.15,6) in Sochi; September 9, 1981 at the Grand Prix of Rieti set a record of the USSR at a distance of 5000 meters - 13.11.99. This result is still a record in Russia. 1982 – 5000 m (result - 13.35,7; hall) in Milan; 1983 - mile (1609 m) (result - 3.58.63; hall) in Oxford. From 1984 to 2008 he owned the record of Russia in the run for 10,000 meters - 27.55,17.

Winner of three European Indoor Championships: 1981 - 3rd place at a distance of 3000 m, Grenoble; 1982 - 3rd place at a distance of 3000 m, Milan; 1983 - 2nd place at a distance of 3000 m, Budapest.

Took second place at the 5000m distance at the World Cup in Montreal in 1979.

European Cup: 1981 - 2nd place at the 5000 m distance in Zagreb; 1983 - 3rd place at a distance of 10,000 m in London.

== Achievements ==
Year	Competition	Venue	Position	Event	Notes
Representing Soviet Union
1979	World cups	Montreal, Canada	2nd	5000 m	
1979	Spartakiad of Peoples of the USSR	Moscow, USSR	1st	5000 m	
1981	European Indoor Championships	Grenoble, France	3rd	3000 m	
1981	USA–USSR Track and Field Dual Meet Series	Leningrad, USSR	1st	5000 m	
1981	European Cup	Zagreb, Croatia	2nd	5000 m	
1982	European Indoor Championships	Milan, Italy	3rd	3000 m	
1983	European Indoor Championships	Budapest, Hungary	2nd	3000 m	
1983	European Cups	London, United Kingdom	3rd	10000 m	
1984	Friendship Games	Moscow, Soviet Union	1st	10,000 m	
