= Ivan Uvizl =

Czech long-distance runner

Personal information
- Born: 16 August 1958 (age 67) Ostrava, Czechoslovakia

Sport
- Sport: Long-distance running
Medal record
Representing Czechoslovakia
IAAF World Indoor Games
Bronze medal – third place	1985 Paris	3000 m

Ivan Uvizl (born 16 August 1958) is a Czech former long-distance runner. He was a bronze medallist at the 1985 IAAF World Indoor Games and was a three-time Czechoslovak champion. He participated three times at the IAAF World Cross Country Championships.

He started running in the late 1970s and began to compete internationally shortly afterwards, including finishes of fifth at the 1981 Summer Universiade and eighth at the 1985 European Athletics Indoor Championships. He won his national titles in this period, taking the outdoor 5000 metres title in 1979 and 1982, then the indoor 3000 metres title in 1985.

His greatest success came at the 1985 IAAF World Indoor Games, where he claimed the bronze medal in the 3000 m with a run of 7:57.92 minutes. He was one of three Czechoslovak medallists there, alongside long jumper Jan Leitner and shot putter Remigius Machura. The following year he made his debut at the 1986 IAAF World Cross Country Championships, then was a 5000 m and 10,000 metres finalist at the 1986 European Athletics Championships. He ran at only two more major international competitions after that, forming part of the national team for the 1990 and 1991 IAAF World Cross Country Championships.

He topped the podium at the Paderborner Osterlauf in 1990, then in 1991 he won both the BIG 25 Berlin and 20 km of Brussels races. He made his marathon debut in 1988 and set a lifetime best of the distance in 1992 at the Munich Marathon, timing 2:14:28 hours. He continued to compete in road races his later years, doing so as a veteran athlete into the 2000s.

A number of his long-distance road personal bests remain Czech records: 44:42minutes for 15 km, 60:24 minutes for the 20 km, 20,114.2 m for the one hour run, and 75:28 minutes for the 25 km distance.

== International competitions ==
Year	Competition	Venue	Position	Event	Notes
1981	Universiade	Bucharest, Romania	5th	5000 m	13:54.11
1985	World Indoor Games	Paris, France	3rd	3000 m	7:57.92
1985	European Indoor Championships	Piraeus, Greece	9th	3000 m	8:15.11
1986	World Cross Country Championships	Colombier, Switzerland	203rd	Senior race	38:46.5
1986	European Championships	Stuttgart, West Germany	9th	5000 m	13:37.26
1986	European Championships	Stuttgart, West Germany	13th	10,000 m	28:20.86
1990	World Cross Country Championships	Aix-les-Bains, France	75th	Senior race	36:03
1990	World Cross Country Championships	Aix-les-Bains, France	17th	Senior team	661 pts
1991	World Cross Country Championships	Antwerp, Belgium	173rd	Senior race	36:58
1991	World Cross Country Championships	Antwerp, Belgium	20th	Senior team	852 pts

== National titles ==
- Czechoslovak Athletics Championships
  - 5000 m: 1979, 1982
- Czechoslovak Indoor Championships
  - 3000 m: 1985
