= Lubomír Tesáček =

Czech long-distance runner

Personal information
- Born: 9 February 1957 Slavkov u Brna, Czechoslovakia
- Died: 29 June 2011 (aged 54) Prague, Czech Republic

Sport
- Sport: Athletics
- Event(s): 3000 m, 5000 m
- Club: Inter Bratislava

Lubomír Tesáček (9 February 1957 – 29 June 2011) was a Czech long-distance runner. He won the gold medal in the 3000 metres at the 1984 European Indoor Championships. He also represented his country at the 1986 European Championships and the Friendship Games since his country boycotted the 1984 Summer Olympics.

He died on 29 June 2011, hit by a tram.

== International competitions ==
Year	Competition	Venue	Position	Event	Notes
Representing Czechoslovakia
1981	European Indoor Championships	Grenoble, France	7th	3000 m	9:07.0
1983	European Indoor Championships	Budapest, Hungary	4th	3000 m	7:58.72
1984	European Indoor Championships	Gothenburg, Sweden	1st	3000 m	7:53.16
1984	Friendship Games	Moscow, Soviet Union	7th	5000 m	13:34.34
1986	European Indoor Championships	Madrid, Spain	8th	3000 m	8:04.74
1986	European Championships	Stuttgart, West Germany	21st (h)	5000 m	13:39.70
1986	European Championships	Stuttgart, West Germany	16th	10,000 m	28:48.61
1987	European Indoor Championships	Liévin, France	9th	3000 m	8:02.04

== Personal bests ==
Outdoor

- 1500 metres – 3:42.91 (Prague 1983)
- 3000 metres – 7:46.99 (Prague 1983)
- 5000 metres – 13:25.62 (Cork 1986)
- 10,000 metres – 28:09.4 (Paris 1986)
- Half marathon – 1:02.58
- Marathon – 2:13:48 (Vienna 1990)

Indoor

- 1500 metres – 3:44.06 (Budapest 1984)
- 3000 metres – 7:48.8 (Prague 1981) NR
- 5000 metres – 13:39.0 (Prague 1984) NR
