= 1991 IAAF World Indoor Championships – Men's 3000 metres =

The men's 3000 metres event at the 1991 IAAF World Indoor Championships was held on 8 and 10 March.

== Medalists ==
Gold	Silver	Bronze
Frank O'Mara; Ireland	Hammou Boutayeb; Morocco	Robert Denmark; Great Britain

== Results ==
=== Heats ===
First 4 of each heat (Q) and next 2 fastest (q) qualified for the semifinals.

Rank	Heat	Name	Nationality	Time	Notes
1	2	Hammou Boutayeb	Morocco	7:48.62	Q, PB
2	2	Robert Denmark	Great Britain	7:48.92	Q
3	2	John Scherer	United States	7:49.05	Q
4	2	Mogens Guldberg	Denmark	7:49.55	Q, NR
5	1	Frank O'Mara	Ireland	7:50.64	Q
6	1	José Luis González	Spain	7:50.69	Q
7	1	Pascal Thiébaut	France	7:50.90	Q
8	1	Jacinto Navarrete	Colombia	7:51.19	Q, AR
9	2	Rob de Brouwer	Netherlands	7:51.34	q, NR
10	2	Mathias Ntawulikura	Rwanda	7:51.37	q, NR
11	2	Anacleto Jiménez	Spain	7:51.67	PB
12	1	Moses Kiptanui	Kenya	7:53.02	
13	1	Mahmoud Kalboussi	Tunisia	7:53.75	NR
14	1	Paul Larkins	Great Britain	7:56.20	
15	1	Yevgeniy Leontyev	Soviet Union	7:56.68	
16	1	Stéphane Franke	Germany	7:58.82	
17	2	Kaï Jenkel	Switzerland	8:03.96	
18	1	Ricardo Vera	Uruguay	8:06.81	
19	1	Jim Norris	United States	8:08.34	
20	2	Nick O'Brien	Ireland	8:10.63	
21	2	Diomede Cishahayo	Burundi	8:16.87	NR
22	2	Tadele Abebe	Ethiopia	8:22.81	
	1	Mohamed Issangar	Morocco	DNF	
	2	Jacky Carlier	France	DNF	

=== Final ===
Rank	Name	Nationality	Time	Notes
1st place, gold medalist(s)	Frank O'Mara	Ireland	7:41.14	CR
2nd place, silver medalist(s)	Hammou Boutayeb	Morocco	7:43.64	PB
3rd place, bronze medalist(s)	Robert Denmark	Great Britain	7:43.90	NR
4	Mogens Guldberg	Denmark	7:44.76	NR
5	John Scherer	United States	7:45.12	PB
6	Pascal Thiébaut	France	7:47.51	NR
7	José Luis González	Spain	7:48.44	
8	Mathias Ntawulikura	Rwanda	7:48.92	NR
9	Jacinto Navarrete	Colombia	7:49.46	AR
10	Rob de Brouwer	Netherlands	7:51.69	
