= 1984 European Athletics Indoor Championships – Men's 3000 metres =

The men's 3000 metres event at the 1984 European Athletics Indoor Championships was held on 4 March.

== Results ==
Rank	Name	Nationality	Time	Notes
1st place, gold medalist(s)	Lubomír Tesáček	Czechoslovakia	7:53.16	
2nd place, silver medalist(s)	Markus Ryffel	Switzerland	7:53.61	
3rd place, bronze medalist(s)	Karl Fleschen	West Germany	7:54.45	
4	Uwe Mönkemeyer	West Germany	7:55.78	
5	Czesław Mojżysz	Poland	7:56.20	
6	Patriz Ilg	West Germany	8:01.06	
7	Spiridon Andriopoulos	Greece	8:04.98	
8	Rune Løchting	Norway	8:09.57	
9	Marios Kassianidis	Cyprus	8:11.49	
	Wolfgang Konrad	Austria	DNF	
	Francisco Sánchez	Spain	DNF	
