= Bruno Lafranchi =

Swiss long-distance runner

Personal information
- Born: 19 July 1955 (age 71) Altdorf UR, Switzerland
- Height: 1.78 m (5 ft 10 in)
- Weight: 60 kg (132 lb)

Sport
- Sport: Athletics
- Events: Marathon, 3000 m steeplechase
- Club: STB, Bern

Bruno Lafranchi (born 19 July 1955 in Altdorf UR) is a Swiss former long-distance runner. He represented his country in the marathon at two consecutive Olympic Games, in 1984 and 1988, as well as two World Championships. His P.R. of 2:11:12 placed him in third at the 1982 Fukuoka Marathon.

== International competitions ==
| Year | Competition | Venue | Position | Event | Notes |
Representing Switzerland
| 1978 | European Championships | Prague, Czechoslovakia | 27th (h) | 3000 m | 8:51.7 |
| 1982 | European Indoor Championships | Milan, Italy | 6th | 3000 m | 8:00.16 |
| 1983 | World Championships | Helsinki, Finland | 23rd | Marathon | 2:14:58 |
| 1984 | Olympic Games | Los Angeles, United States | 50th | Marathon | 2:24:38 |
| 1985 | World Indoor Games | Paris, France | 13th (h) | 3000 m | 8:01.27 |
| 1986 | European Championships | Stuttgart, West Germany | 24th (h) | 5000 m | 13:51.46 |
| 1987 | World Championships | Rome, Italy | – | Marathon | DNF |
| 1988 | Olympic Games | Seoul, South Korea | – | Marathon | DNF |

== Personal bests ==
Outdoor

- 1500 metres – 3:40.85 (Bern 1986)
- 3000 metres – 7:51.70 (Florence 1981)
- 5000 metres – 13:25.97 (Zürich 1986)
- 10,000 metres – 29:10.25 (Lausanne 1985)
- Marathon – 2:11:12 (Fukuoka 1982)
- 3000 metres steeplechase – 8:26.3 (Prague 1978)

Indoor

- 3000 metres – 8:00.16 (Milan 1982)
