= Athletics at the Friendship Games – Men's 5000 metres =

The men's 5000 metres event at the Friendship Games was held on 18 August 1984 at the Grand Arena of the Central Lenin Stadium in Moscow, Soviet Union.

== Results ==
Rank	Name	Nationality	Time	Notes
1st place, gold medalist(s)	Evgeni Ignatov	Bulgaria	13:26.35	
2nd place, silver medalist(s)	Dmitriy Dmitriyev	Soviet Union	13:26.85	
3rd place, bronze medalist(s)	Wodajo Bulti	Ethiopia	13:29.08	
4	Gennadiy Fishman	Soviet Union	13:29.50	
5	Kassa Balcha	Ethiopia	13:32.01	
6	Bekele Debele	Ethiopia	13:33.74	
7	Lubomír Tesáček	Czechoslovakia	13:34.34	
8	Anatoliy Krokhmalyuk	Soviet Union	13:48.52	
9	D. Martin	Tanzania	13:52.55	
10	Pavel Klimeš	Czechoslovakia	13:52.55	
11	A. Fissehatsion	Ethiopia	13:52.55	
12	J. Hidalgo	Colombia	14:29.01	
13	E. Fernández	Colombia	14:47.77	
14	Ricardo Reupo	Peru	14:55.18	
15	N. Dashdorjiin	Mongolia	14:56.01	
16	U. Chardaashin	Mongolia	15:07.32	
17	R. Cichauana	Malaysia	15:23.95	
18	R. Laria	Malaysia	15:29.02	
19	I. Fernández	Cape Verde	15:29.03	
20	José Bautista	Colombia	15:32.19	
21	A. Oru-Barre	Benin	16:07.46	
22	Pey Tu-Kea	Cambodia	16:09.88	
23	Arana Dabo	Guinea-Bissau	17:09.87	
24	S. Augusto	Guinea-Bissau	18:24.03	
25	E. Okulantim	Guinea-Bissau	20:19.15	
26	Ahmad Faitrouni	Lebanon	20:20.23	

== See also ==
- Athletics at the 1984 Summer Olympics – Men's 5000 metres
