= 1982 European Athletics Indoor Championships – Men's 3000 metres =

The men's 3000 metres event at the 1982 European Athletics Indoor Championships was held on 7 March.

== Results ==
Rank	Name	Nationality	Time	Notes
1st place, gold medalist(s)	Patriz Ilg	West Germany	7:53.50	
2nd place, silver medalist(s)	Alberto Cova	Italy	7:54.12	
3rd place, bronze medalist(s)	Valeriy Abramov	Soviet Union	7:54.46	
4	Robert Nemeth	Austria	7:57.72	
5	Francisco Sánchez	Spain	7:57.82	
6	Bruno Lafranchi	Switzerland	8:00.16	PB
7	Hans-Jürgen Orthmann	West Germany	8:00.53	
8	Peter Daenens	Belgium	8:01.21	
9	Ken Newton	Great Britain	8:03.40	
10	Vittorio Fontanella	Italy	8:04.23	
11	Aleksandr Fedotkin	Soviet Union	8:09.89	
12	Klaas Lok	Netherlands	8:14.30	
