= John Doherty (runner) =

Irish long-distance runner

Personal information
- Nationality: British/Irish
- Born: 22 July 1961 (age 64) Leeds, England
- Height: 175 cm (5 ft 9 in)
- Weight: 60 kg (132 lb)

Sport
- Sport: Athletics
- Event: middle/long-distance
- Club: Leeds City AC
Medal record
Men's athletics
Representing Europe
IAAF World Cup
Silver medal – second place	1989 Barcelona	5000 m

John James Doherty (born 22 July 1961) is a former long-distance runner who ran distances from 3000 metres to 10,000 metres. He represented Ireland at the Summer Olympics in 1988 and 1992. He also ran twice for Northern Ireland at the IAAF World Cross Country Championships. His best achievement was a silver medal in the 5000 metres behind Saïd Aouita at the 1989 IAAF World Cup.

Born in Leeds, Doherty competed for England initially before taking up eligibility to represent Northern Ireland and later Ireland through his parents. He won the 1980 AAA Junior title over 3000 metres before taking his first senior national title a year later at the Northern Irish Cross Country Championships.

He attended Providence College on a track scholarship and competed extensively on the American road circuit while there, winning in excess of 35 road races including the 1986 Peachtree Road Race. He also had runner-up finishes at the Azalea Trail Run (twice), Fukuoka International Cross Country (twice), the Bay to Breakers and the Manchester Road Race. He retired from professional running after 1994.

== Personal bests ==
- 3000 metres – 7:41.59 min (1989)
- 5000 metres – 13:14.17 min (1990)
- 10,000 metres – 27:49.74 min (1989)
- 10K run – 27:56 min (1986)

All information from All-Athletics profile

== International competitions ==
Year	Competition	Venue	Position	Event	Notes			
1979	European Junior Championships	Bydgoszcz, Poland	4th	5000 m	13:57.7			
1980	World Cross Country Championships		Junior race	DNF				
1981	World Cross Country Championships	Madrid, Spain		Senior race	36:59	Senior team	1034 pts	
1981	World Cross Country Championships	Madrid, Spain	1988	Olympic Games	Seoul, South Korea	9th	5000 m	13:27.71
1989	IAAF World Cup	Barcelona, Spain	2nd	5000 m	13:25.39			
1992	Olympic Games	Barcelona, Spain	6th	5000 m	13:41.27			

European Cup 5000m Gold 1989

== Circuit wins ==
- DN Galan 5000 m: 1988
- Peachtree Road Race: 1986
- America's Ekiden: 1988 1989

World games Helsinki 5000m 13:15 world best.
