= Gustaw Herling-Grudziński =

Polish writer, journalist, essayist and World War II underground fighter (1919–2000)

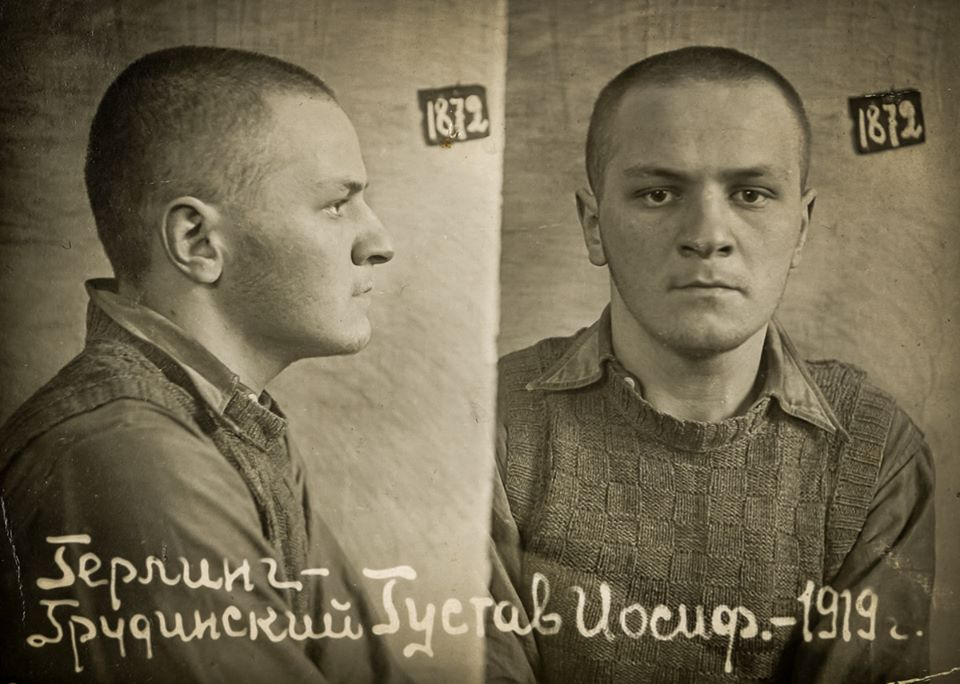
- Gustaw Herling-Grudziński – NKVD photo (Grodno prison, 1940)
- Born: May 20, 1919; Kielce, Poland
- Died: July 4, 2000 (aged 81); Naples, Italy
- Occupation: Writer
- Writing career
- Notable work: A World Apart
- Notable awards: Order of the White Eagle

Gustaw Herling-Grudziński (Polish pronunciation: [ˈgustaf 'herlink gru 'dʑiɲskʲi]; May 20, 1919 − July 4, 2000) was a Polish writer, journalist, essayist, World War II underground fighter, and political dissident abroad during the period of Soviet and communist rule. He is best known for writing a personal account of life in the Soviet Gulag entitled A World Apart, first published in 1951 in London.

== Biography ==
Gustaw Herling-Grudziński was born in Kielce into a Jewish-Polish merchant family of Jakub (Josek) Herling-Grudziński and his wife Dorota (née Bryczkowska). His mother died in 1932 of typhoid. His studies of Polish literature at the Warsaw University were interrupted by the invasion of Poland at the outbreak of World War II.

In late 1939 under the brutal occupation of Poland by Nazi Germany and the Soviet Union, Herling-Grudziński co-founded one of the earliest underground resistance organizations, PLAN ("Polska Ludowa Akcja Niepodległościowa"- "Polish People's Independence Action", or "Polish Popular Independence Action") associated politically with the Polish independent socialist left.

He traveled to then Soviet occupied Grodno and in March 1940 was arrested by the NKVD for attempting to cross the Soviet-Lithuanian border and routinely sentenced to five years of hard labour on "espionage" charges like all Polish intellectuals. Imprisoned in Vitsebsk and two Gulag forced labor camps in Yertsevo and Kargopol in Arkhangelsk Region for 2 years, he was released in 1942 under the Sikorski-Mayski Agreement. He joined Gen. Władysław Anders' Army (Polish II Corps) and later fought in North Africa and in Italy, taking part in the battle of Monte Cassino. For his valor in combat he was decorated with the Virtuti Militari, Poland's highest military decoration.

In 1947 he co-founded and initially co-edited the political and cultural magazine Kultura, then published in Rome. When the magazine moved to Paris, he settled first in London and finally in Naples, Italy, where he married Lidia, a daughter of the philosopher Benedetto Croce. He also wrote for the Italian Tempo Presente run by Nicola Chiaromonte and Ignazio Silone and for various dailies and other periodicals. He died in Naples.

=== A World Apart ===
Herling-Grudziński's most famous book, A World Apart, is a harrowing personal account of the nature of the Soviet communist system. It was translated into English by Joseph Marek (pen-name of Andrzej Ciołkosz) and published with an introduction by Bertrand Russell in 1951 (the 2005 edition was introduced by Anne Applebaum). By describing life inside the Gulag labor camp system of the Soviet NKVD, Herling provided an in-depth analysis of the crimes against humanity under Communist regimes written 10 years before Aleksandr Solzhenitsyn's One Day in the Life of Ivan Denisovich. A World Apart brought Grudziński international acclaim but also criticism from some Soviet sympathizers.

A hero in his native Poland and a well-known if occasionally controversial figure in his adoptive Italy, Herling was for decades the object of quiet but intense admiration among readers and writers throughout Europe. Although a perennial candidate for the Nobel Prize, it wasn't until the recent and widely acclaimed republication of several of his books in the U.S. that he was brought to the attention of a broader American readership. – Kelly Zinkowski, "Gustaw Herling, The Art of Fiction"

A World Apart was published in Russia in 1991. In Italy it was published in 1958 and 1994.

=== Journal Written at Night ===
Commencing in 1971 and until his death, Herling wrote a literary journal, covering essays, criticism, anecdotes, fiction, and memoir. The first three volumes were published consecutively in 1973, 1980, and 1984 in Paris and in Warsaw, as Dziennik pisany nocą (Journal Written at Night). A selection from the Journal Written at Night was translated by Ronald Strom and published as Volcano and Miracle (1997). A selection of his short stories published originally as Collected Stories (Opowiadania zebrane) in 1990 has been translated by Bill Johnston and published in 2003 as The Noonday Cemetery and Other Stories.

== Awards ==
Herling-Grudziński was the winner of many literary prizes: Kultura (1958), Jurzykowski (1964), Kościelskis (1966), The News (1981), the Italian Premio Viareggio prize, the international Prix Gutenberg, and French Pen-Club. In 1998 he was awarded the Order of the White Eagle.

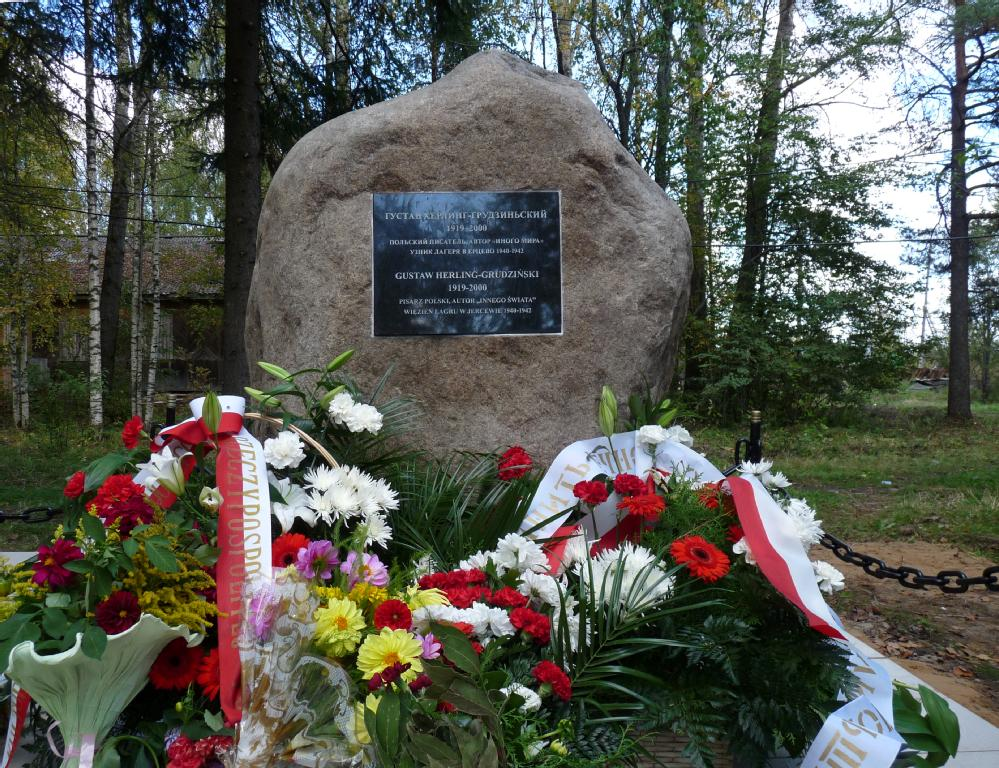
Monument to Herling-Grudziński in Yertsevo with Poland's wreaths, 2009

In September 2009 a monument to him was unveiled in Yertsevo, where he had been imprisoned.

== Books ==
Available in English

- A World Apart: Imprisonment in a Soviet Labor Camp During World War II, Penguin Books, reprint edition, 1996, pp. 284, ISBN 0-14-025184-7.
- Volcano and Miracle: A Selection from the Journal Written at Night, Penguin Books, reprint edition, 1997, pp. 288, ISBN 0-14-023615-5.
- The Island; Three Tales, Penguin Books, reprint edition, 1994, pp. 160, ISBN 0-14-023279-6.
- The Noonday Cemetery and Other Stories, New Directions Publishing, 2003, pp. 256, ISBN 0-8112-1529-6.
