= Bob Verbeeck =

Belgian long-distance runner

Personal information
- Born: 5 August 1960 (age 65) Tessenderlo, Belgium
- Education: Iowa State University
- Height: 1.76 m (5 ft 9 in)
- Weight: 60 kg (132 lb)

Sport
- Sport: Athletics
- Events: 3000 m, 5000 m
- College team: Iowa State Cyclones

Robert "Bob" Verbeeck (born 5 August 1960 in Tessenderlo) is a retired Belgian long-distance runner. He is best known for winning the gold medal in the 3000 metres at the 1985 European Indoor Championships. In addition, he represented his country at the 1984 Summer Olympics reaching the semifinals of the 5000 metres.

He studied economics at the Iowa State University and nowadays is the CEO of a sports marketing agency, Golazo.

== International competitions ==
Year	Competition	Venue	Position	Event	Notes
Representing Belgium
1984	Olympic Games	Los Angeles, United States	21st (sf)	5000 m	13:46.03
1985	World Indoor Games	Paris, France	6th (h)	3000 m	7:55.94^{1}
1985	European Indoor Championships	Piraeus, Greece	1st	3000 m	8:10.84

^{1}Did not finish in the final

== Personal bests ==
Outdoor

- 1500 metres – 3:36.96 (Woluwe 1984)
- One mile – 3:57.98 (Luxembourg 1983)
- 3000 metres – 7:47.22 (Rome 1984)
- 5000 metres – 13:24.73 (Kessel-Lo 1984)

Indoor

- One mile – 3:57.81 (Cosford 1985)
- 3000 metres – 7:55.94 (Paris 1985)
