= Robert Nemeth =

Austrian athletics competitor

Personal information
- Born: 5 June 1958 (age 68) Hofors, Sweden
- Died: 15 December 2015 (aged 57) Mauerbach, Austria
- Height: 1.89 m (6 ft 2 in)
- Weight: 70 kg (154 lb)

Sport
- Sport: Athletics
- Events: 1500 m, 3000 m
- Club: SV Schwechat

Robert Nemeth (5 June 1958 – 15 December 2015) was an Austrian middle- and long-distance runner. He represented his country in the 1500 metres at the 1980 Summer Olympics and the 1983 World Championships, reaching the semifinals on both occasions.

He won a total of 22 Austrian titles in various events. Some of his personal bests are still standing national records.

== International competitions ==
Year	Competition	Venue	Position	Event	Notes
Representing Austria
1977	European Junior Championships	Donetsk, Soviet Union	8th	1500 m	3:50.4
1978	European Indoor Championships	Milan, Italy	5th (h)	1500 m	3:47.4
1978	European Championships	Prague, Czechoslovakia	19th (h)	1500 m	3:44.1
1979	Universiade	Mexico City, Mexico	5th (sf)	800 m	1:50.94
1980	Olympic Games	Moscow, Soviet Union	6th (sf)	1500 m	3:40.8
1981	European Indoor Championships	Grenoble, France	6th	3000 m	9:06.0
1982	European Indoor Championships	Milan, Italy	4th	3000 m	7:57.72
1982	European Championships	Athens, Greece	4th	1500 m	3:37.81
1983	World Championships	Helsinki, Finland	12th (h)	1500 m	3:39.93^{1}
1984	European Indoor Championships	Gothenburg, Sweden	6th	1500 m	3:43.28
1985	European Indoor Championships	Piraeus, Greece	6th	3000 m	8:11.24

^{1}Did not finish in the semifinals

== Personal bests ==
Outdoor

- 800 metres – 1:48.65 (Ebensee 1983)
- 1000 metres – 2:18.20 (Schwechat 1982) former NR
- 1500 metres – 3:35.8 (Rieti 1981)
- One mile – 3:52.42 (Rieti 1981) NR
- 2000 metres – 4:59.56 (Klagenfurt 1984) NR
- 3000 metres – 7:44.08 (Berlin 1984)
- 5000 metres – 13:35.90 (Koblenz 1984)
- 10,000 metres – 29:01.20 (Mistelbach 1982)
- 3000 metres steeplechase – 8:42.98 (Götzis 1981)

Indoor

- 800 metres – 1:49.4 (Vienna 1981)
- 1500 metres – 3:38.50 (Vienna 1985) NR
- One mile – 3:57.4 (San Diego 1982)
- 3000 metres – 7:48.01 (Budapest 1984)
