= Jack Buckner =

British athlete (born 1961)

Personal information
- Nationality: British (English)
- Born: 22 September 1961 (age 64) Wells, Somerset, England
- Height: 173 cm (5 ft 8 in)
- Weight: 59 kg (130 lb)

Sport
- Sport: Athletics
- Event: Long-distance
- Club: Charnwood AC
Medal record
Men's athletics
Representing Great Britain
World Championships
Bronze medal – third place	1987 Rome	5000 m
European Championships
Gold medal – first place	1986 Stuttgart	5000 m
Representing England
Commonwealth Games
Silver medal – second place	1986 Edinburgh	5000m

Jack Richard Buckner (born 22 September 1961) is a former British athlete who competed at the 1988 Summer Olympics and the 1992 Summer Olympics.

== Biography ==
Buckner was educated at St. Petroc's preparatory school in Bude, Cornwall, where he won the Victor Ludorum trophy in 1975, as well as a scholarship to Worksop College in Nottinghamshire. He clocked 4:16.90 for 5th place at The English Schools Championships at 1500m as a 15-year-old. Three years later he won the National Junior 1500m title in 3:50.94, after an administrative blunder prevented him from competing in the English Schools' Championships of the same year.

After leaving Worksop College, Buckner attended Loughborough University, where he read geography. He later completed an MBA degree. During his first year at university Buckner won the University Athletic Union (UAU) 800m title in 1:51.30. This title would prove to be his only real success during his university years, apart from setting a UK under 23 2000m record of 5:01.90 in 1983. It was when Buckner left university that he was able to concentrate fully on his running and by 1986 his 1500 m personal best had been reduced to 3:35.38.

Deciding that the 1500m was a difficult event to crack and due to his relative lack of 800m pace, Buckner decided to try his luck at the longer 5000m event. Representing England, the 1986 Commonwealth Games in Edinburgh, Scotland, was his first major race and he performed brilliantly finishing with a silver medal in 13:25.87 behind fellow countryman Steve Ovett. Hot on the heels of the Commonwealth Games in 1986 were the European Athletics Championships, which would prove to be a far tougher test. Following a 56-second last lap, Buckner went on to win the gold medal in a championship best time of 13:10.15, a record which still stands.

Buckner claimed a bronze medal at the 1987 World Championships in Athletics (13:27.74) and in 1988 he finished 6th in the 5.000 metres in Seoul (13:23.85) after an injury-ravaged season. This was how it would end for Buckner and despite making an appearance at the 1992 Summer Olympics after he came to within half a second of his best time from 1986, he progressed no further than the heats after a fall.

Buckner was twice the British 5000 metres champion after winning the British AAA Championships titles at the 1987 AAA Championships and 1992 AAA Championships.

Shortly after his running career ended, Buckner worked for Adidas before he and his family moved to New Zealand to concentrate on apple farming. This was unsuccessful and they returned to the United Kingdom; Buckner was appointed project director of the athletics board.

Jack's younger brother Tom Buckner was also an international distance runner and gained recognition when he finished 5th at the 1994 Commonwealth Games 3000m steeplechase (8:29.84). Both Tom and Jack have run sub 4-minute miles (Tom 3:58.90 at Portsmouth, UK in 1993) and Jack (3:51.57 at Koblenz, Germany in 1984). Tom and Jack Buckner were the first brothers since the 1950s to compete at the Olympics (in the 1992 Barcelona Olympic games).

== Personal bests ==
- 800 metres – 1:49.80 (1981)
- 1000 metres – 2:18.88 (1982) UKAT 30th
- 1500 metres – 3:35.28 (1984) UKAT 19th
- One mile – 3:51.57 (1984) UKAT 10th
- 2000 metres – 4:53.06 (1987) UKAT 3rd
- Two miles – 8:17.12 (1986) UKAT 7th
- 3000 metres – 7:40.43 (1986) UKAT 6th
- 5000 metres – 13:10.15 (1986) UKAT 4th

NB UKAT denotes position on the United Kingdom all-time athletics lists.
