= Lars Ove Strømø =

Norwegian long-distance runner

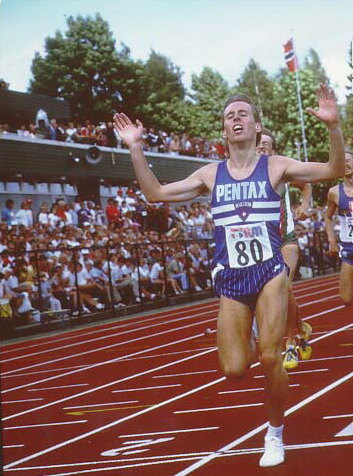

Personal information
- Nationality: Norwegian
- Born: 7 May 1963 (age 63)

Sport
- Sport: Long-distance running
- Event: 5000 metres
- Club: Stord IL; IL Fri; IF Minerva; SK Vidar
- Coached by: Johan Kaggestad

Lars Ove Strømø (born 7 May 1963) is a Norwegian long-distance runner. He competed in the men's 5000 metres at the 1988 Summer Olympics.
