= 1983 European Athletics Indoor Championships – Men's 3000 metres =

The men's 3000 metres event at the 1983 European Athletics Indoor Championships was held on 6 March.

== Results ==
| Rank | Name | Nationality | Time | Notes |
|---|---|---|---|---|
| 1st place, gold medalist(s) | Dragan Zdravković | Yugoslavia | 7:54.73 | |
| 2nd place, silver medalist(s) | Valeriy Abramov | Soviet Union | 7:57.79 | |
| 3rd place, bronze medalist(s) | Uwe Mönkemeyer | West Germany | 7:58.11 | |
| 4 | Lubomír Tesáček | Czechoslovakia | 7:58.72 | |
| 5 | Ari Paunonen | Finland | 7:59.53 | |
| 6 | Khristos Papakhristos | Greece | 8:00.10 | |
| 7 | László Szász | Hungary | 8:00.20 | |
| 8 | Hagen Melzer | East Germany | 8:00.74 | |
| 9 | Hans-Jürgen Orthmann | West Germany | 8:01.83 | |
| 10 | Axel Krippschock | East Germany | 8:05.80 | |
| 11 | Gerhard Hartmann | Austria | 8:13.90 | |
