= Andrzej Ciołkosz =

Andrzej Ciołkosz (1929–1952), pen name Joseph Marek, was a young Polish language writer, literary critic and translator. He is best known for his Polish-English translation of A World Apart: The Journal of a Gulag Survivor, written by a Polish World War II underground fighter, camp survivor, and dissident political writer Gustaw Herling-Grudziński. The book written in Polish, was a memoir combining various literary genres: novel, essay, psychological portrait, as well as sociological and political dissertation. It was first published in 1951 in London, a year before the sudden death of Ciołkosz at the age of 23.

== Life ==
Andrzej Ciołkosz was born to Adam Ciołkosz, activist of the Polish Socialist Party elected, at age of 27, as member of the Polish parliament Sejm; and his wife Lidia née Kahan of Jewish background (alumni of the Jagiellonian University). The family escaped to England during the 1939 invasion of Poland by Nazi Germany. His father was an active politician in exile, opposing Soviet takeover of Poland after 1945. Young Andrzej, for whom the study of ESL became a lot easier, translated Gustaw Herling under the pseudonym Joseph Marek, but died suddenly a year later in 1952. Nothing else is known. His mother, also a writer (who published the year he died), died in 2002 at age of 99 bestowed with many awards.
