= Kim Yeong-gil =

South Korean long-distance runner

Personal information
- Nationality: South Korean
- Born: 1 January 1965 (age 61)
- Education: Keimyung University; Yeungnam High School

Sport
- Sport: Long-distance running
- Event: 5000 metres

Korean name
- Hangul: 김영길
- Hanja: 金榮吉
- RR: Gim Yeonggil
- MR: Kim Yŏnggil

Kim Yeong-gil (born 1 January 1965) is a South Korean long-distance runner. He competed in the men's 5000 metres at the 1988 Summer Olympics.
