= Tim Hutchings =

English middle- and long-distance runner (b.1958)

Personal information
- Nationality: British (English)
- Born: 4 December 1958 (age 67) Wood Green, Middlesex, England
- Height: 183 cm (6 ft 0 in)
- Weight: 72 kg (159 lb)

Sport
- Sport: Athletics
- Event: long-distance
- Club: Crawley AC
Medal record
Men's athletics
European Championships
Representing Great Britain
Bronze medal – third place	1986 Stuttgart	5000 m
Commonwealth Games
Representing England
Bronze medal – third place	1986 Edinburgh	5000 m
World Cross Country Championships
Representing England
Silver medal – second place	1984 East Rutherford	Long Course
Representing Great Britain
Silver medal – second place	1989 Stavanger	Long Course

Timothy Hilton Hutchings (born 4 December 1958) is a male former middle- and long-distance runner who represented England and Great Britain internationally and current athletics commentator.

== Biography ==
Hutchings' track events were the 1500 metres, 5000 metres and 10,000 metres. His main championship performances in track and field were a 5000 m bronze medal in the 1986 European Championship and a bronze medal in the 5000 m at the 1986 Commonwealth Games. He also finished fourth in the 1984 Olympic Games.

After appearing in the 1500 metres at the 1978 Commonwealth Games he represented England in the 5,000 metres event, at the 1982 Commonwealth Games in Brisbane, Australia. Four years later he represented England, where he won his bronze medal in the 5,000 metres event, at the 1986 Commonwealth Games in Edinburgh, Scotland. A fourth and final appearance came at the 1990 Commonwealth Games in Auckland, New Zealand.

In cross country running, he twice earned a silver medal in the IAAF World Cross Country Championships, in 1984 and 1989. He also won the 1985 edition of the Belfast International Cross Country race. In 1989, he picked up a hamstring injury that put a premature end to his career.

Hutchings became the British 5000 metres champion after winning the British AAA Championships title at the 1986 AAA Championships. He was also considered British champion in 1982 after finishing second behind Wilson Waigwa because he was the highest placed British athlete.

== Personal life ==
After retiring from competition, Hutchings co-founded the Brighton Marathon in 2010 with Tom Naylor.

Tim Hutchings was educated at a boys' independent boarding school: Worth in West Sussex.

Nowadays, he works as an athletics commentator for British Eurosport.
