= Stig Roar Husby =

Norwegian long-distance runner

Stig Roar Husby (born 12 September 1954 in Trondheim, Sør-Trøndelag) is a retired Norwegian long-distance runner. He represented Strindheim IL and IL i BUL.

In 3000 metres he finished fourth at the 1973 European Junior Championships and eighth at the 1985 European Indoor Championships. He finished tenth in marathon at the 1983 World Championships but did not finish at the 1984 Summer Olympics. He became Norwegian champion in 5000 metres in 1983 and 1985 and in 10,000 metres in 1975, 1979, 1980 and 1983.

He has his education from the Norwegian School of Sport Sciences.

== Personal bests ==
- 3000 metres - 7:50.92 min (1985) - eleventh among Norwegian 3000 m runners.
- 5000 metres - 13:27.53 min (1984) - eighth among Norwegian 5000 m runners.
- 10,000 metres - 28:32.88 min (1983) - thirteenth among Norwegian 10,000 m runners.
- Half marathon - 1:03:38 min (1988)
- Marathon - 2:11:29 min (1983) - second among Norwegian marathon runners, only behind Geir Kvernmo.

== Achievements ==
Year	Competition	Venue	Position	Event	Notes
Representing Norway
1983	World Championships	Helsinki, Finland	10th	Marathon	2:11:29
1984	Olympic Games	Los Angeles, United States	—	Marathon	DNF
