= Yertsevo =

Yertsevo Ерцево
- Settlement
- Interactive map of Yertsevo
- Location of Yertsevo Yertsevo (Arkhangelsk Oblast)
- Coordinates: 60°47′54″N 40°04′32″E
- Country: Russia
- Federal subject: Arkhangelsk Oblast
- Administrative district: Konoshsky District
- SelsovietSelsoviet: Yertsevsky Selsoviet
- Rural locality status since: January 1, 2005

Population (2010 Census)
  - Total: 4,201
  - Estimate (2012): 4,187 (−0.3%)
- Time zone: UTC+3 (MSK)
- Postal code: 164000
- OKTMO ID: 11622418101

Yertsevo (Russian: Ерцево) is a rural locality (a settlement) in Konoshsky District of Arkhangelsk Oblast, Russia, located west of Lake Vozhe. Population: 4,201 (2010 census); 4,013 (2002 census); 4,683 (1989 Soviet census).

== History ==
Yertsevo was the location of a Soviet concentration camp of the Gulag system before, during, and after World War II. The Yertsevo Camp Complex, one of over a dozen such complexes shared between Arkhangelsk and Vologda Oblasts, was established by the Soviet State Political Directorate secret service already in the 1930s. Since 1940, the camp was managed by the Kargopolsky ITL (Ispravitelno-Trudovoy Lager) directorate. It was located about 3 miles (4.8 km) from the forest where the prisoners cut lumber all day, year-round, usually up to their waist in snow, emaciated, and always hungry.

Witness accounts confirm that the prisoners could survive in the forest-brigade for no more than two years. The dead were buried in mass graves with wooden tags attached to their legs with a string. Only the fresh young arrivals in the Yertsevo camp were put through the forest ordeal. The work productivity norm set by the prison administration was impossible to reach for many of the victims.

Yertsevo was granted urban-type settlement status in 1960, but was demoted to a rural locality on January 1, 2005.

== In literature ==
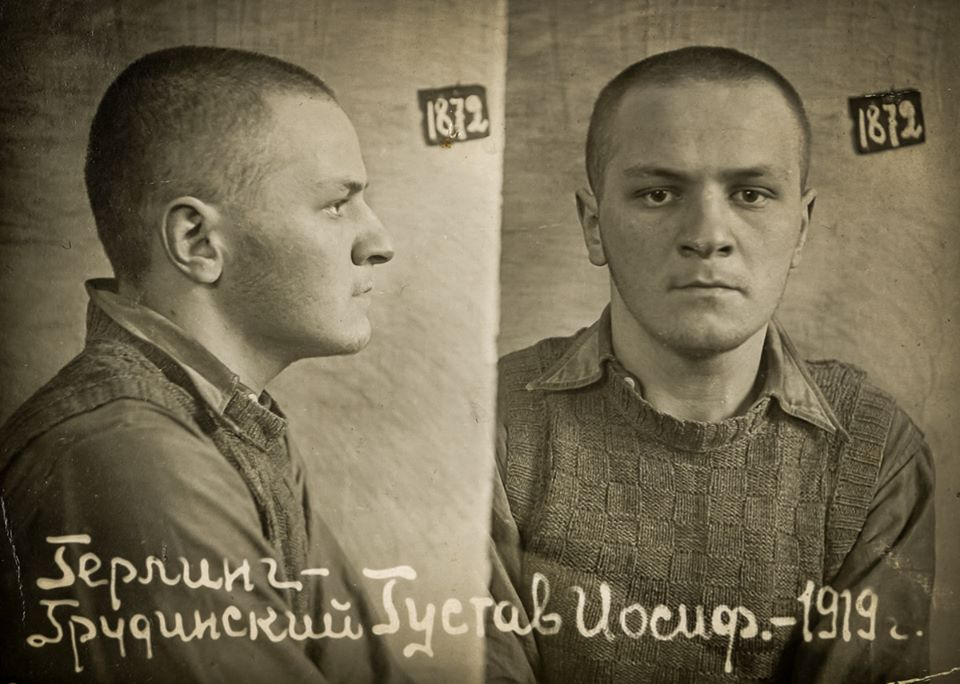
Herling-Grudziński pictured in an NKVD prison mug-shot, 1940

The Yertsevo labor camp was described in a book entitled A World Apart, written by the eminent Polish writer and philosopher Gustaw Herling-Grudziński, camp survivor and, later, political dissident under the communist system. Captured by the NKVD in early 1940 as a Polish army soldier soon after the Soviet invasion of Poland, Herling-Grudziński spent a year and a half in the Yertsevo camp. Sentenced to five years, but eventually amnestied, he was also imprisoned at the Kargopol labor camp facility.

Prisoners were sent to the bath-house once every month. Some of them self-mutilated themselves at work by cutting off their fingers and rubbing dirt into the wounds in order to be sent to the camp infirmary, the only escape from death by exhaustion. Herling-Grudziński's account of camp life in the Soviet Gulag preceded Solzhenitsyn's revelations by more than a decade.

Since September 2009 there is a monument to the writer.

== See also ==
- List of Gulag camps
