= Evgeni Ignatov (runner) =

Bulgarian long-distance runner

Medal record

Men's athletics

Representing Bulgaria

European Indoor Championships
Silver medal – second place	1981 Grenoble	3000 m

Evgeni Ignatov (Bulgarian: Евгени Игнатов, born June 25, 1959, in Nikolovo, Ruse Province) is a retired long-distance runner from Bulgaria, who represented his native country in the men's 5,000 metres and 10,000 metres at the 1988 Summer Olympics. He also competed at the 1992 Summer Olympics in Barcelona, Spain.

== Achievements ==
Year	Competition	Venue	Position	Event	Notes
Representing Bulgaria
1981	European Indoor Championships	Grenoble, France	2nd	2860 m	
1982	European Championships	Athens, Greece	4th	5000 m	13:30.95
1984	Friendship Games	Moscow, Soviet Union	1st	5000 m	13:26.35
1986	European Championships	Stuttgart, West Germany	4th	5000 m	13:13.15
1987	World Championships	Rome, Italy	6th	5000 m	13:29.68
1988	Olympic Games	Seoul, South Korea	8th	5000 m	13:26.41
1988	Olympic Games	Seoul, South Korea	12th	10,000 m	28:09.32
1990	European Championships	Split, Yugoslavia	17th (h)	5000m	13:37.51
1990	European Championships	Split, Yugoslavia	—	10,000m	DNF
1992	Olympic Games	Barcelona, Spain	—	5000 m	DNF
