= A World Apart (book) =

1951 memoir by Gustaw Herling-Grudziński

- Front cover, 1986 edition
- Author: Gustaw Herling-Grudziński
- Original title: Inny świat: zapiski sowieckie
- Translator: Joseph Marek (pseudonym of Andrzej Ciołkosz)
- Language: English
- Genre: Memoir
- Publisher: Arbor House
- Publication date: Polish samizdat 1980
- Publication place: Great Britain
- English publication date: 1951 (1986, 1996 reprints)
- Media type: Print (Hardcover, Paperback)
- ISBN: 0-87795-821-1

A World Apart: The Journal of a Gulag Survivor (Polish: Inny świat: zapiski sowieckie) is a memoir written by Gustaw Herling-Grudziński, combining various literary genres: novel, essay, psychological portrait, as well as sociological and political dissertation. It was first published in 1951 in London in the English translation by Andrzej Ciołkosz. In the Polish language, the book was first published in London in 1953, then in Poland by the underground press in 1980, and officially in 1988.

The book's title, A World Apart, is an allusion to the Fyodor Dostoyevsky's novel Notes from the House of the Dead. An epigraph to Grudziński's book quotes Dostoyevsky:

Here there is a world apart, unlike everything else, with laws of its own, its own manners and customs, and here in the house of the living dead — life as nowhere else and a people apart.

It expresses Herling's convictions that the Gulag environment does not belong to the normal, human world, but is a type of sick and distinctive civilisation which is contrary to all previous human experience. In addition, a number of elements of the plot are associated with the House of the Dead.

== Galeria ==
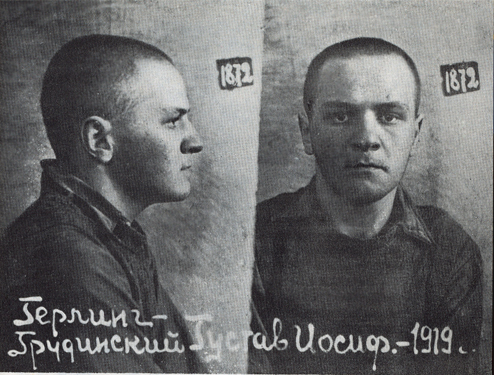
Gustaw Herling-Grudziński – NKVD photography (Grodno, 1940)

== Description ==
The book A World Apart contains the author's recollections beginning from his time spent incarcerated in the former USSR Gulag labour camp in Yertsevo in Arkhangelsk Oblast, and a description of the journey he took to join the Polish divisions forming in Persia. Written 10 years before Aleksandr Solzhenitsyn's One Day in the Life of Ivan Denisovich and 22 years before The Gulag Archipelago, it brought him international acclaim but also criticism from Soviet sympathizers.

The book contains detailed, often drastic depictions from the lives of Gulag prisoners. Much of the book is given to the analysis and interpretation of the attitudes, behaviour and emotions of specific prisoners and also to the internal mechanisms and independent laws of behaviour in the camps.

The book was initially greeted well in England, with a foreword written by Bertrand Russell but had to wait until 1985 for its publication in France. According to Herling, this was due to the reluctance of the left-leaning publishing houses in that country. With greater interest in the Gulag, it has been reprinted in Britain, with the foreword written this time by Anne Applebaum.

As Herling noted in a preface to the Russian edition (1986) of his book, the cultural establishment almost always followed Sartre’s advice: "even if it is true, don’t speak about it". The Russian edition preceded some Western language editions: the French translation of the book was not published until 1995, the Italian one until 1994, both delayed by the unwillingness of local pro-Soviet sympathizers to discuss Soviet crimes. The Polish bibuła underground edition was published in 1980. The normal edition was published only near the fall of communism in Poland, in 1988.

== See also ==
- In the Claws of the GPU, a Gulag memoir by a citizen of interwar Poland, published in 1935.
- A Travel to the Land Ze-Ka, a similar early memoir by a Polish citizen, published in 1949
