= João Campos =

Portuguese middle-distance runner

Personal information
- Born: 22 September 1958 (age 68) Albufeira, Portugal

Sport
- Sport: Track and field
Medal record
Representing Portugal
World Indoor Championships
Gold medal – first place	1985 Paris	3000m
European Indoor Championships
Bronze medal – third place	1986 Madrid	3000m

João José Pontes Campos (born 22 September 1958) is a Portuguese former middle-distance runner who competed in the 1980 Summer Olympics and in the 1984 Summer Olympics.
