= Walter Merlo =

Italian long-distance runner

Personal information
- Nationality: Italian
- Born: 18 May 1965 Cuneo
- Died: 8 August 1998 (aged 33) Cuneo

Sport
- Country: Italy
- Sport: Athletics
- Event(s): Long-distance running Marathon

Achievements and titles
- Personal bests: 3000 m indoor: 7:47.61 (1987); 5000 m: 13:37:71 (1991)

Walter Merlo (18 May 1965 – 8 August 1998) was an Italian long-distance runner who competed at one edition of the IAAF World Cross Country Championships at senior level (1989).

== Biography ==
In 1987 his 7:47.61 on the 3000 metres indoor was the second best season performance at the world. This is still the fourth Italian best performance of all time.

Tragically dead at age 33, in mountain, falling on a climb of Corno Stella.

== Achievements ==
Year	Competition	Venue	Position	Event	Time	Notes
1985	European Indoor Championships	(Greece) Pireaus	12th	3000 m	8:20.54	
1986	European Indoor Championships	(Spain) Madrid	6th	3000 m	8:03.29	
1987	European Indoor Championships	(France) Liévin	Semi	3000 m	8:12.85	
