= Frank O'Mara =

Irish runner (born 1960)

Frank O’Mara
Personal information
- Nationality: Irish
- Born: 17 July 1960 (age 66) Limerick, Ireland
- Education: University of Arkansas

Sport
- Sport: Track and Field, running

Frank O’Mara (born 17 July 1960) is an Irish businessman and former runner. A three-time Olympian, he was twice World Indoor Champion in the 3000m. O’Mara has post-graduate degrees from the University of Arkansas and had a successful career in the wireless industry.

== Early life ==
O’Mara began his athletics career at age 10, finishing 3rd in the All-Ireland 400 metres. He attended JFK Primary School and St. Munchin's College, where he played rugby. O’Mara won the Irish schools 1500 metres with an intermediate championship record of 3:58.2. His victory that day led St. Munchin's to win the team title.

== College athletics ==
O’Mara received a scholarship to the University of Arkansas, where he studied engineering. While there, he ran 3:40.5 in Houston, Texas in 1983 to become only the third Irishman to ever win the NCAA 1500m. That same year, he was on the first University of Arkansas team to win a Championship of America title at the Penn Relays, where he anchored the distance medley relay. He also anchored the 4 × 1500 metres relay team to victory and was named the Penn Relays’ most valuable track performer. That summer he ran 3:52.50 at the Cork City Sports and was a semi-finalist at the inaugural World Championships in Helsinki. In 1997, he was inducted into the University of Arkansas Sports Hall of Honor.

== Athletics career ==
Early in his career, O'Mara was primarily a competitor in the mile run. He set a personal best in 1985 for the 1500m, finishing second at the Ivo Van Dame Invitational with a time of 3:34.02. Three weeks later, he won the Fifth Avenue Mile in 3:52.28. He set his personal best for the mile when finishing 4th in the 1986 Grand Prix final in Rome with a time of 3:51.06. He finished 8th at the 1986 European Athletics Championship in Stuttgart, in the 1500m race won by Steve Cram ahead of Sebastian Coe. Also that summer, he was a member of the Irish quartet of Coghlan, O’Sullivan and Flynn who broke the world 4 x mile record; they became the first team to break 16 minutes, setting a new mark of 15:49.08.

In 1987, O'Mara broke the Irish record for 5000 metres, finishing third place at the Bislett Games in Oslo. His time of 13:13.02 stood as the national record for 11 years. A finalist at the 1987 World Championships in Rome, he placed 9th behind the winner Saïd Aouita. He competed in three Olympic Games, finishing 4th in the preliminary rounds of the 1500m at the 1984 Summer Olympics in Los Angeles and fourth in his heat of the 5000m at the 1992 Summer Olympics in Barcelona, narrowly missing the next round.

O'Mara's two major victories in the 3000m happened during World Indoor Championships. At Indianapolis in 1987, he won a tactical race in 8:03.32, beating fellow countryman Paul Donovan, who placed second. In 1989, he failed to defend his title at Budapest, finishing 5th behind Saïd Aouita. That same year, he edged out close friend Marcus O’Sullivan to win the US Indoor Championships at Madison Square Garden. But in 1991, he reclaimed his title with a dominating performance in Seville. Leading at the bell, he easily pulled away from Hammou Boutayeb in a championship record of 7:41.14, which was the third fastest time ever run. He also won the British AAA Championships title in the 3,000 metres event at the 1992 AAA Championships.

On five occasions, O'Mara was Irish national champion, and in 2015 he was inducted into the Irish Athletics Hall of Fame in 2015.

== Business career ==
After earning a Bachelor of Science in Civil Engineering, O'Mara served as an assistant coach for the University of Arkansas and was on the coaching staff when Arkansas won its first NCAA Triple Crown in 1985. He continued his education and received an MBA and a JD. He was admitted to the Arkansas Bar in 1993. He was an RTÉ track & field commentator from 1995 to 2000, during which he covered the Atlanta and Sydney Olympics.

He began his business career as lawyer for Alltel Wireless in Little Rock, Arkansas in 1996. He held various executive roles at Alltel, including Executive Vice-President of Human Resources and of Customer Service. During his tenure as Chief Marketing Officer, Alltel changed its logo and rebranded over 800 retail locations and 3,000 agent locations, launched a product called My Circle and implemented an award-winning advertising campaign. In January 2009, Verizon purchased Alltel for $28.1 billion.

O’Mara was named CEO of Allied Wireless, a subsidiary of Atlantic Tele Network (ATN) in September 2009. ATN bought former Alltel markets from Verizon. ATN also bought the Alltel brand, enabling Allied to operate as Alltel in the acquired markets. O’Mara led a team of largely former Alltel colleagues who worked on systems, networks, and customer support. In 2013, ATN sold Allied Wireless to AT&T. During his tenure as CEO, O’Mara was a member of the executive committee of the board of CTIA, the wireless trade association.

== Personal life ==
In 2010, O'Mara was diagnosed with Parkinson's disease.

== Personal Bests ==
Year	Competition	Venue	Position	Event	Notes
1984	Tom Black Invitation	Knoxville, Tennessee, US	2nd	Outdoor 800 m	1:47.75 Archived 2020-04-03 at the Wayback Machine
1985	Ivo Van Dame Invitational	Brussels, Belgium	2nd	Outdoor 1500m	3:34.02 Archived 2020-04-03 at the Wayback Machine
1986	Golden Gala	Rome, Italy	4th	Outdoor mile	3:51.06 Archived 2020-04-03 at the Wayback Machine
1987	Athletissima	Lausanne, Switzerland	6th	Outdoor 2000m	4:59.00 Archived 2020-04-03 at the Wayback Machine
1989	Nikaïa Grand Prix	Nice, France	5th	Outdoor 3000m	7:40.41 Archived 2020-04-03 at the Wayback Machine
1988	Kodak Classic	Gateshead, United Kingdom	1st	Outdoor 2 miles	8:17.78 Archived 2020-04-03 at the Wayback Machine
1987	Bislett Games	Oslo, Norway	3rd	Outdoor 5000 m	13:13.02 Archived 2020-04-03 at the Wayback Machine
1991	Mt. Sac Relays	Walnut, California, US	1st	Outdoor 10,000m	27:58.01 Archived 2020-04-03 at the Wayback Machine
1987	Brown Invite	Providence, Rhode Island, US	1st	Indoor 1500 m	3.37.9h
1986	Fayetteville Invitational	Fayetteville, Arkansas, US	1st	Indoor mile	3.52.30
1991	World Indoor Championships	Sevilla, Spain	1st	Indoor 3000	7.41.14

== Achievements ==
Year	Competition	Venue	Position	Event	Notes
Representing Ireland
1984	Olympic Games	Los Angeles, United States	heats	1500 m	3:41.76
1985	European Indoor Championships	Piraeus, Greece	4th	3000 m	8:11.11
1986	European Championships	Stuttgart, West Germany	8th	1500 m	3:42.90
1987	World Indoor Championships	Indianapolis, United States	1st	3000 m	8:03.32
1987	World Championships	Rome, Italy	9th	5000 m	13:32.04
1988	Olympic Games	Seoul, South Korea	33rd (h)	5000 m	13:59.46
1989	World Indoor Championships	Budapest, Hungary	5th	3000 m	7:52.21
1990	European Championships	Split, Yugoslavia	24th (h)	5000 m	13:59.44
1991	World Indoor Championships	Seville, Spain	1st	3000 m	7:41.14
1991	World Championships	Tokyo, Japan	27th (h)	5000 m	14:03.19
1992	Olympic Games	Barcelona, Spain	18th (h)	5000 m	13:38.79
1994	European Championships	Helsinki, Finland	13th	5000 m	13:58.75
