= 1987 IAAF World Indoor Championships =

1st IAAF World Indoor Championships
- Dates: March 6–8
- Host city: Indianapolis, United States
- Venue: Hoosier Dome
- Events: 24
- Participation: 401 athletes from 85 nations

The 1st IAAF World Indoor Championships in Athletics were held in Indianapolis, United States from March 6 to March 8, 1987. The championship had previously been known as the World Indoor Games, which were held once before changing the name.

Being the second championship of its kind, there were several championship records. New championship records were set for every single women's event. There were a total number of 401 participating athletes from 85 countries.

== Results ==
=== Men ===
Event	Gold		Silver		Bronze	
60 metres	Lee McRae (USA)	6.50^{1} (CR)	Mark Witherspoon (USA)	6.54	Pierfrancesco Pavoni (ITA)	6.59
200 metres	Kirk Baptiste (USA)	20.73 (CR)	Bruno Marie-Rose (FRA)	20.89	Robson da Silva (BRA)	20.92
400 metres	Antonio McKay (USA)	45.98	Roberto Hernández (CUB)	46.09	Michael Franks (USA)	46.19
800 metres	José Luíz Barbosa (BRA)	1:47.49	Vladimir Graudyn (URS)	1:47.68	Faouzi Lahbi (MAR)	1:47.79
1500 metres	Marcus O'Sullivan (IRL)	3:39.04 (CR)	José Manuel Abascal (ESP)	3:39.13	Han Kulker (NED)	3:39.51
3000 metres	Frank O'Mara (IRL)	8.03.32	Paul Donovan (IRL)	8.03.39	Terry Brahm (USA)	8:03.92
60 metres hurdles	Tonie Campbell (USA)	7.51 (CR)	Stéphane Caristan (FRA)	7.62	Nigel Walker (GBR)	7.66
5000 metres walk	Mikhail Shchennikov (URS)	18:27.79 (CR)	Jozef Pribilinec (TCH)	18:27.80	Ernesto Canto (MEX)	18:38.71
High jump	Igor Paklin (URS)	2.38 (CR)	Hennadiy Avdyeyenko (URS)	2.38	Ján Zvara (TCH)	2.34
Pole vault	Sergey Bubka (URS)	5.85 (CR)	Earl Bell (USA)	5.80	Thierry Vigneron (FRA)	5.80
Long jump	Larry Myricks (USA)	8.23 (CR)	Paul Emordi (NGR)	8.01	Giovanni Evangelisti (ITA)	8.01
Triple jump	Mike Conley (USA)	17.54 (CR)	Oleg Protsenko (URS)	17.26	Frank Rutherford (BAH)	17.02
Shot put	Ulf Timmermann (GDR)	22.24 (CR)	Werner Günthör (SUI)	21.61	Sergey Smirnov (URS)	20.67

^{1} Ben Johnson of Canada originally won the 60 metres in 6.41, but was disqualified in September 1989 after admitting to using steroids between 1981 and 1988.

=== Women ===
Event	Gold		Silver		Bronze	
60 metres	Nelli Fiere-Cooman (NED)	7.08 (CR)	Aneliya Nuneva (BUL)	7.10^{1}	Angela Bailey (CAN)	7.12
200 metres	Heike Drechsler (GDR)	22.27 (CR)	Merlene Ottey-Page (JAM)	22.66	Grace Jackson (JAM)	23.21
400 metres	Sabine Busch (GDR)	51.66 (CR)	Lillie Leatherwood (USA)	52.54	Judit Forgács (HUN)	52.68
800 metres	Christine Wachtel (GDR)	2:01.32 (CR)	Gabriela Sedláková (TCH)	2:01.85	Lyubov Kiryukhina (URS)	2:01.98
1500 metres	Doina Melinte (ROU)	4:05.68 (CR)	Tatyana Samolenko (URS)	4:07.08	Svetlana Kitova (URS)	4:07.59
3000 metres	Tatyana Samolenko (URS)	8:46.52 (CR)	Olga Bondarenko (URS)	8:47.08	Maricica Puică (ROU)	8:47.92
60 metres hurdles	Cornelia Oschkenat (GDR)	7.82 (CR)	Yordanka Donkova (BUL)	7.85	Ginka Zagorcheva (BUL)	7.99
3000 metres walk	Olga Krishtop (URS)	12:05.49 (CR)	Giuliana Salce (ITA)	12:36.76	Ann Peel (CAN)	12:38.97
High jump	Stefka Kostadinova (BUL)	2.05 (CR)	Susanne Beyer (GDR)	2.02	Emiliya Dragieva (BUL)	2.00
Long jump	Heike Drechsler (GDR)	7.10 (CR)	Helga Radtke (GDR)	6.94	Yelena Belevskaya (URS)	6.76
Shot put	Natalya Lisovskaya (URS)	20.52 (CR)	Ilona Briesenick (GDR)	20.28	Claudia Losch (FRG)	20.14

^{1} Angella Issajenko of Canada originally finished second in the 60 metres in 7.08, but was disqualified in September 1989 after admitting to steroid use between 1985 and 1988.

== Medal table ==
Rank	Nation	Gold	Silver	Bronze	Total
1	Soviet Union (URS)	6	5	4	15
2	United States (USA)	6	3	2	11
3	East Germany (GDR)	6	3	0	9
4	Ireland (IRL)	2	1	0	3
5	Bulgaria (BUL)	1	2	2	5
6	Brazil (BRA)	1	0	1	2
6	Netherlands (NED)	1	0	1	2
6	Romania (ROU)	1	0	1	2
9	Czechoslovakia (TCH)	0	2	1	3
9	France (FRA)	0	2	1	3
11	Italy (ITA)	0	1	2	3
12	Jamaica (JAM)	0	1	1	2
13	Cuba (CUB)	0	1	0	1
13	Nigeria (NGR)	0	1	0	1
13	Spain (ESP)	0	1	0	1
13	Switzerland (SUI)	0	1	0	1
17	Canada (CAN)	0	0	2	2
18	Bahamas (BAH)	0	0	1	1
18	Great Britain (GBR)	0	0	1	1
18	Hungary (HUN)	0	0	1	1
18	Mexico (MEX)	0	0	1	1
18	Morocco (MAR)	0	0	1	1
18	West Germany (FRG)	0	0	1	1
Totals (23 entries)		24	24	24	72

== Participating nations ==
- Anguilla (1)
- Antigua and Barbuda (3)
- Argentina (2)
- Aruba (1)
- Australia (9)
- Austria (4)
- Bahamas (2)
- Bahrain (1)
- Barbados (2)
- Belgium (4)
- Bermuda (2)
- Bolivia (1)
- Botswana (1)
- Brazil (3)
- Bulgaria (12)
- Burkina Faso (1)
- Burundi (1)
- Canada (15)
- Cayman Islands (1)
- Chile (3)
- China (8)
- Colombia (2)
- Costa Rica (1)
- Cuba (7)
- Cyprus (2)
- Czechoslovakia (7)
- Denmark (2)
- Dominican Republic (2)
- East Germany (10)
- Ecuador (2)
- Egypt (4)
- Finland (3)
- France (12)
- Gambia (1)
- Great Britain (17)
- Greece (3)
- Guatemala (4)
- Hungary (6)
- Iceland (2)
- India (1)
- Ireland (4)
- Italy (15)
- Ivory Coast (1)
- Jamaica (8)
- Japan (5)
- Kenya (10)
- Kuwait (1)
- Lebanon (2)
- Liberia (1)
- Malaysia (2)
- Mauritius (1)
- Mexico (6)
- Morocco (2)
- Netherlands (9)
- Netherlands Antilles (2)
- New Zealand (1)
- Nigeria (11)
- Norway (4)
- Panama (1)
- Paraguay (1)
- Peru (2)
- Philippines (1)
- Poland (6)
- Romania (10)
- Saint Kitts and Nevis (3)
- Saint Lucia (1)
- Saint Vincent and the Grenadines (2)
- El Salvador (1)
- Senegal (2)
- Seychelles (1)
- Trinidad and Tobago (1)
- Soviet Union (24)
- Spain (12)
- Swaziland (1)
- Sweden (5)
- Switzerland (7)
- Thailand (1)
- Trinidad and Tobago (1)
- Turks and Caicos Islands (2)
- Uganda (2)
- United States (42)
- United States Virgin Islands (3)
- West Germany (14)
- Yugoslavia (3)
- Zimbabwe (2)

== See also ==
- 1987 in athletics (track and field)
