= Carey Nelson =

Canadian long-distance runner

Personal information
- Born: June 4, 1964 (age 62) Saskatoon, Saskatchewan, Canada

Sport
- Sport: Track and field
Medal record
Representing Canada
Summer Universiade
Silver medal – second place	1985 Kobe	5000m

Carey Michael Nelson (born June 4, 1963) is a former long-distance runner from Canada, who represented his native country at the 1996 Summer Olympics in Atlanta, Georgia. There the resident of Vancouver, British Columbia finished the men's marathon in 35th place (2:19:39). In 1991 he won the Houston Marathon in a time of 2:12:28.

== Achievements ==
Year	Competition	Venue	Position	Notes
Representing Canada
1996	Olympic Games	Atlanta, United States	35th	Marathon
