= Stefano Mei =

Italian long-distance runner (born 1963)

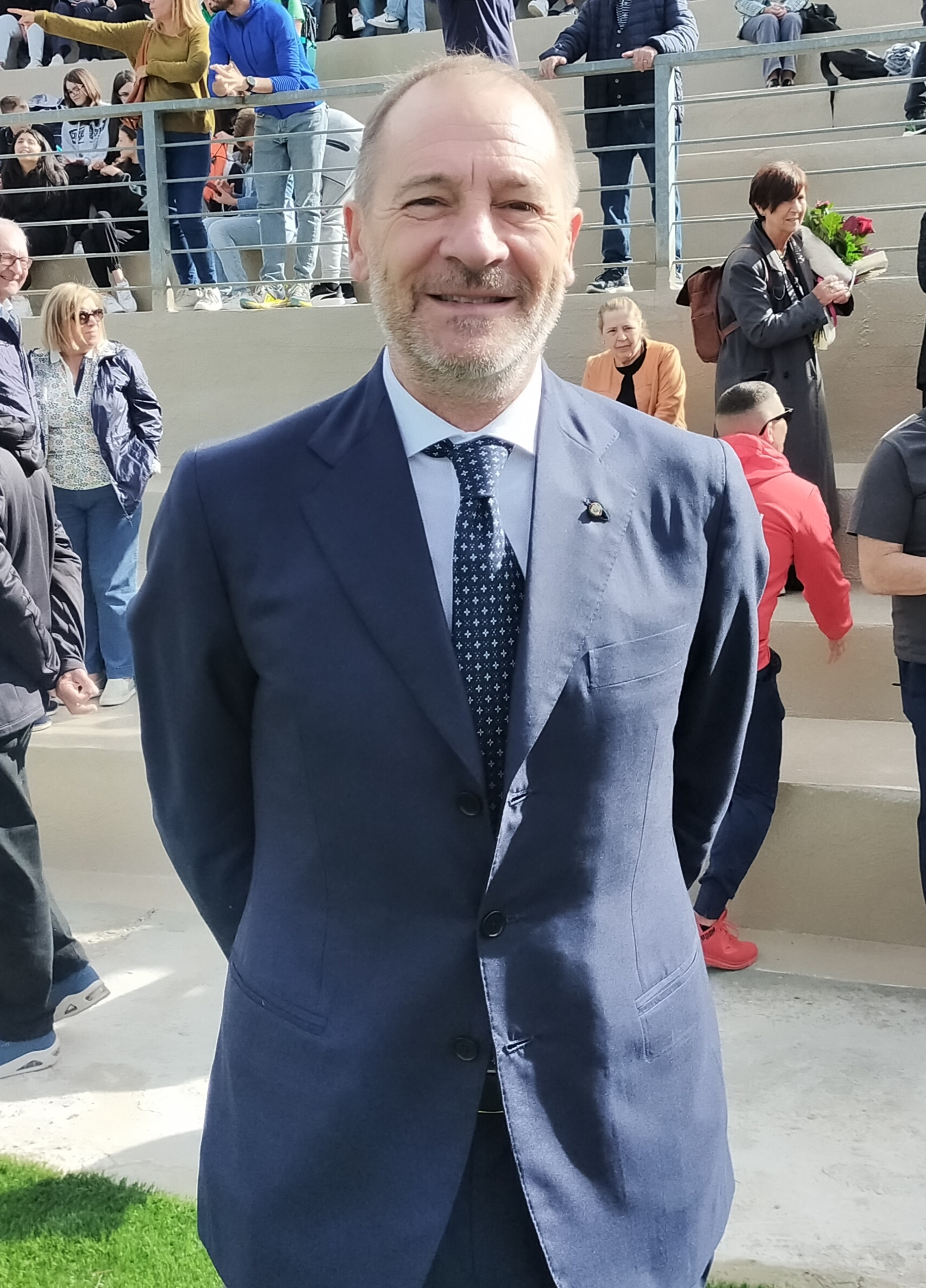
- Mei in 2025

Personal information
- Nationality: Italian
- Born: February 3, 1963 (age 63) La Spezia, Italy
- Height: 1.85 m (6 ft 1 in)
- Weight: 80 kg (176 lb)

Sport
- Country: Italy
- Sport: Athletics
- Events: Middle distance run Long-distance run
- Club: G.S. Fiamme Oro

Achievements and titles
- Personal bests: 1500 m: 3:34.57 (1986); 5000 m: 13:11.57 (1986); 10000 m: 27:43.92 (1986)
Medal record
Men's athletics
Representing Italy
Event	1st	2nd	3rd
European Championships	1	1	1
European Indoor Championships	0	1	0
Universiade	2	0	0
World Cup	0	1	0
European Cup	0	0	1
Total	3	3	2
European Championships
Gold medal – first place	1986 Stuttgart	10,000 m
Silver medal – second place	1986 Stuttgart	5000 m
Bronze medal – third place	1990 Split	10,000 m
European Indoor Championships
Silver medal – second place	1986 Madrid	3000 m
Universiade
Gold medal – first place	1985 Kobe	5000 m
Gold medal – first place	1989 Duisburg	5000 m
World Cup
Silver medal – second place	1985 Canberra	5000 m
European Cup
Bronze medal – third place	1985 Moscow	1500 m

Stefano Mei (born 3 February 1963 in La Spezia) is an Italian long-distance runner who specialized in the 5000 and 10000 metres. European champion on 10000 m in 1986.

From 31 January 2021 he is the new president of Italian Athletics Federation (FIDAL).

== Biography ==
Stefano Mei won eight medals, at senior level, at the International athletics competitions. He participated at two editions of the Summer Olympics (1984 and 1988), he has 42 caps in national team from 1981 to 1994. In his career he won 8 times the national championships. Since 2 December 2012 Stefano Mei was Federal Councillor of the Federazione Italiana di Atletica Leggera (FIDAL), in the Franco Arese leaderships.

== Achievements ==
Year	Competition	Venue	Position	Event	Notes
Representing Italy
1982	European Championships	Athens, Greece	17th (h)	1500 m	3:43.05
1983	World Championships	Helsinki, Finland	20th (sf)	1500 m	3:41.78
1984	Olympic Games	Los Angeles, United States	14th (sf)	1500 m	3:37.96
1985	European Indoor Championships	Piraeus, Greece	7th	1500 m	3:41.26
1985	European Cup	Moscow, Soviet Union	3rd	1500 m	3:45.14
1985	Universiade	Kobe, Japan	1st	5000 m	13:56.48
1985	World Cup	Canberra, Australia	2nd	5000 m	14:05.99
1986	European Indoor Championships	Madrid, Spain	2nd	3000 m	7:59.12
1986	European Championships	Stuttgart, West Germany	2nd	5000 m	13:11.57
1986	European Championships	Stuttgart, West Germany	1st	10,000m	27:56.79
1988	Olympic Games	Seoul, South Korea	7th	5000 m	13:26.17
1989	World Indoor Championships	Budapest, Hungary	8th	3000 m	7:53.73
1989	Universiade	Duisburg, West Germany	1st	5000 m	13:39.04
1990	European Championships	Split, Yugoslavia	7th	5000 m	13:27.13
1990	European Championships	Split, Yugoslavia	3rd	10,000 m	28:04.46
1991	World Championships	Tokyo, Japan	—	5000 m	DNF
1992	European Indoor Championships	Genoa, Italy	7th	3000 m	7:51.42

== National titles ==
Stefano Mei has won 8 times the individual national championship.

- 4 wins in 5000 metres at the Italian Athletics Championships (1984, 1986, 1989, 1991)
- 1 win in 1500 metres at the Italian Athletics Championships (1985)
- 3 wins in 3000 metres at the Italian Athletics Indoor Championships (1985, 1986, 1989)

== See also ==
- Italian all-time lists - 1500 metres
- Italian all-time lists - 5000 metres
- Italian all-time lists - 10000 metres
- FIDAL Hall of Fame
