= 1990 IAAF World Cross Country Championships – Senior men's race =

Senior men's race at the 1990 IAAF World Cross Country Championships
- Organisers: IAAF
- Edition: 18th
- Date: March 25
- Host city: Aix-les-Bains, Rhône-Alpes, France
- Venue: Hippodrome de Marlioz
- Events: 1
- Distances: 12.2 km – Senior men
- Participation: 230 athletes from 43 nations

The Senior men's race at the 1990 IAAF World Cross Country Championships was held in Aix-les-Bains, France, at the Hippodrome de Marlioz on March 25, 1990. A report on the event was given in the Glasgow Herald.

Complete results, medallists, and the results of British athletes were published.

Khalid Skah of Morocco won the race ahead of Kenya's Moses Tanui. Julius M. Korir, unrelated to Olympic steeplechase champion Julius Korir, won the individual bronze medal.

== Race results ==
=== Senior men's race (12.2 km) ===
==== Individual ====
Rank	Athlete	Country	Time
1st place, gold medalist(s)	Khalid Skah	Morocco	34:21
2nd place, silver medalist(s)	Moses Tanui	Kenya	34:21
3rd place, bronze medalist(s)	Julius M. Korir	Kenya	34:22
4	Haji Bulbula	Ethiopia	34:25
5	William Mutwol	Kenya	34:26
6	Ibrahim Kinuthia	Kenya	34:30
7	Domingos Castro	Portugal	34:45
8	Abebe Mekonnen	Ethiopia	34:49
9	Paul Kipkoech	Kenya	34:50
10	Antonio Prieto	Spain	34:52
11	Salvatore Antibo	Italy	34:55
12	Hammou Boutayeb	Morocco	34:55
13	Dionísio Castro	Portugal	34:57
14	Tesfaye Tafa	Ethiopia	34:57
15	Martín Fiz	Spain	35:02
16	Marti ten Kate	Netherlands	35:07
17	Boniface Merande	Kenya	35:08
18	Richard Nerurkar	United Kingdom	35:12
19	Addis Abebe	Ethiopia	35:13
20	John Ngugi	Kenya	35:14
21	Paul Arpin	France	35:14
22	Joseph Kiptum	Kenya	35:16
23	Ed Eyestone	United States	35:16
24	Jillo Dube	Ethiopia	35:17
25	Samuel Nyangincha	Kenya	35:18
26	Jos Maes	Belgium	35:19
27	Debebe Demisse	Ethiopia	35:19
28	Adrian Passey	United Kingdom	35:20
29	Mohamed El Massoudi	Morocco	35:20
30	Brahim Lahlafi	Morocco	35:21
31	Ezequiel Canario	Portugal	35:22
32	Alejandro Gómez	Spain	35:24
33	Chala Kelele	Ethiopia	35:24
34	Carey Nelson	Canada	35:25
35	António Pinto	Portugal	35:27
36	José Manuel García	Spain	35:28
37	Aaron Ramirez	United States	35:29
38	Abel Antón	Spain	35:31
39	Oleg Strizhakov	Soviet Union	35:32
40	Mikhail Khramov	Soviet Union	35:33
41	Francisco Pacheco	Mexico	35:35
42	Pat Carroll	Australia	35:36
43	Giuseppe Miccoli	Italy	35:36
44	Francis Mukuka	Zambia	35:37
45	Constantino Esparcia	Spain	35:37
46	Peter Brett	Australia	35:38
47	Salvatore Bettiol	Italy	35:41
48	Jamie Harrison	Australia	35:42
49	Oleg Syroyezhko	Soviet Union	35:42
50	Henrique Crisostomo	Portugal	35:43
51	Carlo Terzer	Italy	35:45
52	Gino van Geyte	Belgium	35:46
53	Miloud Djellal	Algeria	35:46
54	Pablo Cerón	Mexico	35:47
55	Zdenek Mezulianik	Czechoslovakia	35:47
56	Hideyuki Suzuki	Japan	35:47
57	Naomi Okabe	Japan	35:48
58	Manuel Matias	Portugal	35:48
59	Bob Kempainen	United States	35:49
60	Yevgeniy Zherebin	Soviet Union	35:51
61	Antonio Serrano	Spain	35:51
62	Phillip Clode	New Zealand	35:52
63	Johni Pazin	Brazil	35:53
64	Angelo Carosi	Italy	35:56
65	Bertrand Itsweire	France	35:58
66	Are Nakkim	Norway	36:00
67	Martin Vrabel	Czechoslovakia	36:01
68	Gerry Curtis	Ireland	36:01
69	Vicente Polo	Spain	36:01
70	Andy Bristow	United Kingdom	36:01
71	Stephen Bwalya	Zambia	36:02
72	Frank O'Mara	Ireland	36:02
73	Raffaello Alliegro	Italy	36:02
74	Wami Alemayehu	Ethiopia	36:03
75	Ivan Uvizl	Czechoslovakia	36:03
76	Noel Berkeley	Ireland	36:03
77	Thierry Watrice	France	36:04
78	Sergey Smirnov	Soviet Union	36:05
79	William Taylor	United States	36:06
80	Ivo Claes	Belgium	36:06
81	Håvard Tveite	Norway	36:08
82	Abundio Mondragon	Mexico	36:08
83	Adalberto Velez	Mexico	36:09
84	John Woods	Ireland	36:10
85	Sid-Ali Sakhri	Algeria	36:12
86	Haydar Dogan	Turkey	36:14
87	Wilson Theleso	Botswana	36:14
88	Markus Graf	Switzerland	36:15
89	Markus Pingpank	West Germany	36:15
90	Melese Feissa	Ethiopia	36:15
91	Chris Robison	United Kingdom	36:16
92	Paul McCloy	Canada	36:16
93	Mark Furlan	New Zealand	36:17
94	Khaled Boulami	Morocco	36:17
95	Darren Klassen	Canada	36:17
96	Juvenal Ribeiro	Portugal	36:18
97	Marcelo Cascabelo	Argentina	36:18
98	José da Silva	Brazil	36:19
99	Thierry Pantel	France	36:19
100	Shozo Shimoju	Japan	36:21
101	Nikolay Chameyev	Soviet Union	36:21
102	Hamid Oubadriss	Morocco	36:22
103	Roberto Ramirez	Mexico	36:24
104	Salem Majdoubi	Morocco	36:25
105	Eddy Hellebuyck	Belgium	36:25
106	Walter Durbano	Italy	36:26
107	Artur Castro	Brazil	36:27
108	Mohamed Difallah	Algeria	36:29
109	Colin Dalton	Australia	36:29
110	Terry Croyle	United States	36:30
111	Clair Wathier	Brazil	36:30
112	Hansjörg Brücker	Switzerland	36:31
113	Adriano Pezzoli	Italy	36:34
114	Jari Venäläinen	Finland	36:34
115	Mathias Ntawulikura	Rwanda	36:35
116	Herman Hofstee	Netherlands	36:36
117	Shaun Creighton	Australia	36:36
118	Franco Boffi	Italy	36:37
119	Goran Raičević	Yugoslavia	36:38
120	Chris Weber	Canada	36:38
121	Mark King	United Kingdom	36:39
122	Vesa Siivonen	Finland	36:39
123	René Godlieb	Netherlands	36:39
124	Pierre Levisse	France	36:41
125	Diamantino dos Santos	Brazil	36:42
126	Geraldo Francisco de Assis	Brazil	36:44
127	Mamix Declercq	Belgium	36:44
128	Jonny Danielson	Sweden	36:45
129	Peter Zrastak	Czechoslovakia	36:45
130	Joseph Mahmoud	France	36:48
131	Vijay Kumar Mishra	India	36:49
132	Aissa Remel	Algeria	36:50
133	William Mangan	United States	36:51
134	Dennis Leck	United States	36:52
135	Shojiro Maeda	Japan	36:53
136	Suresh Pandey	India	36:53
137	Helge Dolsvåg	Norway	36:54
138	John Christiansen	Denmark	36:55
139	Luciano Flores	Mexico	36:58
140	João de Sousa	Brazil	36:58
141	Sefa Het	Turkey	36:58
142	Jerry Kooymans	Canada	36:59
143	Marius Hasler	Switzerland	37:00
144	Bruno Le Stum	France	37:01
145	Norman Tinkham	Canada	37:01
146	Örjan Hemström	Sweden	37:02
147	Arto Kuusisto	Finland	37:03
148	Roberto Alonso	Mexico	37:03
149	Shivkumar Shreshta	India	37:04
150	Tonnie Dirks	Netherlands	37:04
151	Gennadiy Temnikov	Soviet Union	37:04
152	Willy Goddaert	Belgium	37:06
153	José Carlos Adán	Spain	37:07
154	Mohamed Taher Kebaili	Algeria	37:07
155	Antonio Martins	France	37:09
156	Claus Clausen	Denmark	37:09
157	Eirik Hansen	Norway	37:10
158	John Lenihan	Ireland	37:10
159	Rorri Currie	Canada	37:14
160	Nigel Adams	United Kingdom	37:15
161	Lubomir Tesacek	Czechoslovakia	37:16
162	Moulay Ali Ouadih	Morocco	37:16
163	Terje Näss	Norway	37:17
164	Jukka Tammisuo	Finland	37:24
165	Lahcene Babaci	Algeria	37:25
166	Mahieddine Belhadj	Algeria	37:25
167	Brian Rushworth	United Kingdom	37:29
168	Ruddy Walem	Belgium	37:33
169	Gabriel Awaseb	Namibia	37:33
170	Valdenor dos Santos	Brazil	37:33
171	Mark Coogan	United States	37:34
172	Tomihiro Umetsu	Japan	37:36
173	Roy Dooney	Ireland	37:39
174	Petr Pipa	Czechoslovakia	37:40
175	Julio César Gómez	Argentina	37:40
176	Martin Ryan	Ireland	37:42
177	Craig Dickson	United States	37:43
178	Pat Meffan	New Zealand	37:44
179	Seyed Hamid Sadjadi	Iran	37:47
180	Nihat Bagci	Turkey	37:49
181	Aart Stigter	Netherlands	37:52
182	Jörgen Salo	Finland	37:52
183	Mourad Bouldjadj	Algeria	37:52
184	Mohinder Singh	India	37:53
185	John Vermeule	Netherlands	37:53
186	Jørn Holmen	Norway	37:54
187	Nick de Castella	Australia	37:54
188	Kaj Ådjers	Finland	37:55
189	Henk Gommer	Netherlands	37:57
190	Deon McNeilly	United Kingdom	37:57
191	Ebrahim Etta-Ati	Iran	37:58
192	Ahmet Altun	Turkey	37:59
193	Tsutomu Yuda	Japan	37:59
194	Richard Charette	Canada	38:04
195	Detlef Schwarz	West Germany	38:05
196	Bernd Bürger	West Germany	38:06
197	Gunnar Skånøy	Norway	38:15
198	Tommy Ekblom	Finland	38:24
199	Mohamed Belabbès	Algeria	38:25
200	Raishimane Kikina	Botswana	38:26
201	John Downes	Ireland	38:30
202	Fateh Singh	India	38:33
203	Manuel Mendoza	Mexico	38:36
204	Hasan Sabzevari	Iran	38:41
205	Kamel Bouhaloufa	France	38:44
206	Turgay Mese	Turkey	38:45
207	Leela Ram	India	38:47
208	Peter Govaerts	Belgium	38:52
209	Gian Luigi Macina	San Marino	38:53
210	Robert Kusi	Botswana	39:08
211	Tsai Ching-Chou	Chinese Taipei	39:10
212	Fatih Cintimar	Turkey	39:26
213	Enda Fitzpatrick	Ireland	39:26
214	Chou Hsien-Kuang	Chinese Taipei	39:40
215	Pascal Face	Mauritius	39:42
216	Calvin Dallas	U.S. Virgin Islands	39:45
217	Garry Henry	Australia	39:58
218	Kao Chuan-Kuang	Chinese Taipei	39:59
219	Francisco Figueredo	Paraguay	40:34
220	Garfield Westgate	Canada	40:42
221	Sudhir Kumar Singh	India	40:56
222	Mike Felicite	Mauritius	40:59
223	Patrick Moonsamy	Mauritius	41:23
224	Fady Khoury	Lebanon	42:30
225	Greg Johnson	U.S. Virgin Islands	43:11
226	Makudi Mubenga	Zaire	48:37
—	Carlos Monteiro	Portugal	DNF
—	Risto Ulmala	Finland	DNF
—	Joaquim Silva	Portugal	DNF
—	Paul Taylor	United Kingdom	DNF

==== Teams ====
Rank	Team	Points
1st place, gold medalist(s)	Kenya: Moses Tanui / 2; Julius M. Korir / 3; William Mutwol / 5; Ibrahim Kinuthia / 6; Paul Kipkoech / 9; Boniface Merande / 17; (John Ngugi) / (20); (Joseph Kiptum) / (22); (Samuel Nyangincha) / (25)	42
2nd place, silver medalist(s)	Ethiopia: Haji Bulbula / 4; Abebe Mekonnen / 8; Tesfaye Tafa / 14; Addis Abebe / 19; Jillo Dube / 24; Debebe Demisse / 27; (Chala Kelele) / (33); (Wami Alemayehu) / (74); (Melese Feissa) / (90)	96
3rd place, bronze medalist(s)	Spain: Antonio Prieto / 10; Martín Fiz / 15; Alejandro Gómez / 32; José Manuel García / 36; Abel Antón / 38; Constantino Esparcia / 45; (Antonio Serrano) / (61); (Vicente Polo) / (69); (José Carlos Adán) / (153)	176
4	Portugal: Domingos Castro / 7; Dionísio Castro / 13; Ezequiel Canario / 31; António Pinto / 35; Henrique Crisostomo / 50; Manuel Matias / 58; (Juvenal Ribeiro) / (96); (Carlos Monteiro) / (DNF); (Joaquim Silva) / (DNF)	194
5	Morocco: Khalid Skah / 1; Hammou Boutayeb / 12; Mohamed El Massoudi / 29; Brahim Lahlafi / 30; Khaled Boulami / 94; Hamid Oubadriss / 102; (Salem Majdoubi) / (104); (Moulay Ali Ouadih) / (162)	268
6	Italy: Salvatore Antibo / 11; Giuseppe Miccoli / 43; Salvatore Bettiol / 47; Carlo Terzer / 51; Angelo Carosi / 64; Raffaello Alliegro / 73; (Walter Durbano) / (106); (Adriano Pezzoli) / (113); (Franco Boffi) / (118)	289
7	Soviet Union: Oleg Strizhakov / 39; Mikhail Khramov / 40; Oleg Syroyezhko / 49; Yevgeniy Zherebin / 60; Sergey Smirnov / 78; Nikolay Chameyev / 101; (Gennadiy Temnikov) / (151)	367
8	United States: Ed Eyestone / 23; Aaron Ramirez / 37; Bob Kempainen / 59; William Taylor / 79; Terry Croyle / 110; William Mangan / 133; (Dennis Leck) / (134); (Mark Coogan) / (171); (Craig Dickson) / (177)	441
9	United Kingdom: Richard Nerurkar / 18; Adrian Passey / 28; Andy Bristow / 70; Chris Robison / 91; Mark King / 121; Nigel Adams / 160; (Brian Rushworth) / (167); (Deon McNeilly) / (190); (Paul Taylor) / (DNF)	488
10	Mexico: Francisco Pacheco / 41; Pablo Cerón / 54; Abundio Mondragon / 82; Adalberto Velez / 83; Roberto Ramirez / 103; Luciano Flores / 139; (Roberto Alonso) / (148); (Manuel Mendoza) / (203)	502
11	France: Paul Arpin / 21; Bertrand Itsweire / 65; Thierry Watrice / 77; Thierry Pantel / 99; Pierre Levisse / 124; Joseph Mahmoud / 130; (Bruno Le Stum) / (144); (Antonio Martins) / (155); (Kamel Bouhaloufa) / (205)	516
12	Belgium: Jos Maes / 26; Gino van Geyte / 52; Ivo Claes / 80; Eddy Hellebuyck / 105; Mamix Declercq / 127; Willy Goddaert / 152; (Ruddy Walem) / (168); (Peter Govaerts) / (208)	542
13	Australia: Pat Carroll / 42; Peter Brett / 46; Jamie Harrison / 48; Colin Dalton / 109; Shaun Creighton / 117; Nick de Castella / 187; (Garry Henry) / (217)	549
14	Canada: Carey Nelson / 34; Paul McCloy / 92; Darren Klassen / 95; Chris Weber / 120; Jerry Kooymans / 142; Norman Tinkham / 145; (Rorri Currie) / (159); (Richard Charette) / (194); (Garfield Westgate) / (220)	628
15	Brazil: Johni Pazin / 63; José da Silva / 98; Artur Castro / 107; Clair Wathier / 111; Diamantino dos Santos / 125; Geraldo Francisco de Assis / 126; (João de Sousa) / (140); (Valdenor dos Santos) / (170)	630
16	Ireland: Gerry Curtis / 68; Frank O'Mara / 72; Noel Berkeley / 76; John Woods / 84; John Lenihan / 158; Roy Dooney / 173; (Martin Ryan) / (176); (John Downes) / (201); (Enda Fitzpatrick) / (213)	631
17	Czechoslovakia: Zdenek Mezulianik / 55; Martin Vrabel / 67; Ivan Uvizl / 75; Peter Zrastak / 129; Lubomir Tesacek / 161; Petr Pipa / 174	661
18	Algeria: Miloud Djellal / 53; Sid-Ali Sakhri / 85; Mohamed Difallah / 108; Aissa Remel / 132; Mohamed Taher Kebaili / 154; Lahcene Babaci / 165; (Mahieddine Belhadj) / (166); (Mourad Bouldjadj) / (183); (Mohamed Belabbès) / (199)	697
19	Japan: Hideyuki Suzuki / 56; Naomi Okabe / 57; Shozo Shimoju / 100; Shojiro Maeda / 135; Tomihiro Umetsu / 172; Tsutomu Yuda / 193	713
20	Netherlands: Martin ten Kate / 16; Herman Hofstee / 116; René Godlieb / 123; Tonnie Dirks / 150; Aart Stigter / 181; John Vermeule / 185; (Henk Gommer) / (189)	771
21	Norway: Are Nakkim / 66; Håvard Tveite / 81; Helge Dolsvåg / 137; Eirik Hansen / 157; Terje Näss / 163; Jørn Holmen / 186; (Gunnar Skånøy) / (197)	790
22	Finland: Jari Venäläinen / 114; Vesa Siivonen / 122; Arto Kuusisto / 147; Jukka Tammisuo / 164; Jörgen Salo / 182; Kaj Ådjers / 188; (Tommy Ekblom) / (198); (Risto Ulmala) / (DNF)	917
23	India: Vijay Kumar Mishra / 131; Suresh Pandey / 136; Shivkumar Shreshta / 149; Mohinder Singh / 184; Fateh Singh / 202; Leela Ram / 207; (Sudhir Kumar Singh) / (221)	1009
24	Turkey: Haydar Dogan / 86; Sefa Het / 141; Nihat Bagci / 180; Ahmet Altun / 192; Turgay Mese / 206; Fatih Cintimar / 212	1017

- Note: Athletes in parentheses did not score for the team result

== Participation ==
An unofficial count yields the participation of 230 athletes from 43 countries in the Senior men's race, one athlete (senior men) less than the official number published.

- Algeria (9)
- Argentina (2)
- Australia (7)
- Belgium (8)
- Botswana (3)
- Brazil (8)
- Canada (9)
- Chinese Taipei (3)
- Czechoslovakia (6)
- Denmark (2)
- Ethiopia (9)
- Finland (8)
- France (9)
- India (7)
- Iran (3)
- Ireland (9)
- Italy (9)
- Japan (6)
- Kenya (9)
- Lebanon (1)
- Mauritius (3)
- Mexico (8)
- Morocco (8)
- Namibia (1)
- Netherlands (7)
- New Zealand (3)
- Norway (7)
- Paraguay (1)
- Portugal (9)
- Rwanda (1)
- San Marino (1)
- Soviet Union (7)
- Spain (9)
- Sweden (2)
- Switzerland (3)
- Turkey (6)
- United Kingdom (9)
- United States (9)
- U.S. Virgin Islands (2)
- West Germany (3)
- Yugoslavia (1)
- Zaire (1)
- Zambia (2)

== See also ==
- 1990 IAAF World Cross Country Championships – Junior men's race
- 1990 IAAF World Cross Country Championships – Senior women's race
- 1990 IAAF World Cross Country Championships – Junior women's race
