= 1995 European Cross Country Championships =

International athletics competition

The 2nd European Cross Country Championships were held at Alnwick in England on 2 December 1995. Paulo Guerra took his second title in the men's competition and Annemari Sandell won the women's race.

== Results ==
=== Men individual 9km ===
Pos.	Runners	Time
1st place, gold medalist(s)	(Portugal) Paulo Guerra	26:40
2nd place, silver medalist(s)	(Spain) Alejandro Gómez	26:43
3rd place, bronze medalist(s)	(United Kingdom) Andrew Pearson	26:47
4.	(United Kingdom) Keith Cullen	26:48
5.	(France) Mustapha Essaïd	26:52
6.	(United Kingdom) Jon Brown	26:56
7.	(Portugal) Alfredo Bras	27:01
8.	(Spain) José Manuel García	27:03
9.	(Italy) Giuliano Battoletti	27:06
10.	(Spain) Manuel Pancorbo	27:06
11.	(Ukraine) Serhiy Lebid	27:06
12.	(Spain) Pere Arco	27:17

103 runners finished.

=== Men teams ===
Pos.	Team	Points
1st place, gold medalist(s)	Spain; Alejandro Gómez; José Manuel García; Manuel Pancorbo; Pere Arco	32; 2; 8; 10; 12
2nd place, silver medalist(s)	Portugal; Paulo Guerra; Alfredo Bras; José Ramos; José Regalo	37; 1; 7; 14; 15
3rd place, bronze medalist(s)	United Kingdom; Andrew Pearson; Keith Cullen; Jon Brown; David Taylor	55; 3; 4; 6; 42
4.	France; Mustapha Essaid; Benoit Zwierzchlewski; Arnaud Fourdin; Hakim Bagy	60; 5; 13; 18; 24
5.	Italy; Giuliano Battocletti; Vincenzo Modica; Luigi Di Lello; Antonio Armuzzi	111; 9; 27; 37; 38
6.	Russia; Aleksandr Bolkhovitin; Semen Shustin; Sergey Fedotov; Nikolay Kerimov	131; 26; 32; 34; 39
7.	Ireland	133
8.	Denmark	160

Total 20 teams

=== Women individual 4.3 km ===
Pos.	Runners	Time
1st place, gold medalist(s)	(Finland) Annemari Sandell	13:52
2nd place, silver medalist(s)	(Sweden) Sara Wedlund	14:07
3rd place, bronze medalist(s)	(Russia) Nina Belikova	14:09
4.	(Romania) Elene Fidatov	14:10
5.	(Russia) Alla Zhilyaeva	14:17
6.	(France) Annette Sergent-Palluy	14:18
7.	(Republic of Ireland) Sinead Delahunty	14:18
8.	(Romania) Stela Olteanu	14:20
9.	(Portugal) Ana Dias	14:22
10.	(United Kingdom) Elizabeth Talbot	14:23
11.	(Romania) Iulia Negura	14:24
12.	(Russia) Yelena Baranova	14:25

79 runners finished.

=== Women teams ===
Pos.	Team	Points
1st place, gold medalist(s)	Russia; Nina Belikova; Alla Zhilyaeva; Yelena Baranova	20; 3; 5; 12
2nd place, silver medalist(s)	Romania; Elene Fidatov; Stela Olteanu; Iulia Negura	23; 4; 8; 11
3rd place, bronze medalist(s)	France; Annette Sergent-Palluy; Zahia Dahmani; Laurence Vivier	41; 6; 15; 20
4.	Spain; Ana Alonso; Isabel Martinez; Julia Vaquero	55; 16; 17; 22
5.	Portugal; Ana Dias; Carla Sacramento; Helena Sampaio	55; 9; 19; 27
6.	Belgium; Anja Smolders; Anne-Marie Danneels; Veronique Collard	59; 13; 14; 32
7.	United Kingdom	65
8.	Italy	83

Total 17 teams
