= 1995 IAAF World Cross Country Championships – Senior women's race =

Senior women's race at the 1995 IAAF World Cross Country Championships
- Organisers: IAAF
- Edition: 23rd
- Date: March 25
- Host city: Durham, County Durham, United Kingdom
- Venue: University of Durham
- Events: 1
- Distances: 6.47 km – Senior women
- Participation: 135 athletes from 39 nations

The Senior women's race at the 1995 IAAF World Cross Country Championships was held in Durham, United Kingdom, at the University of Durham on March 25, 1995. A report on the event was given in The New York Times and in the Herald.

Complete results, medallists, and the results of British athletes were published.

== Race results ==
=== Senior women's race (6.47 km) ===
==== Individual ====
Rank	Athlete	Country	Time
1st place, gold medalist(s)	Derartu Tulu	Ethiopia	20:21
2nd place, silver medalist(s)	Catherina McKiernan	Ireland	20:29
3rd place, bronze medalist(s)	Sally Barsosio	Kenya	20:39
4	Margaret Ngotho	Kenya	20:40
5	Gete Wami	Ethiopia	20:49
6	Joan Nesbit	United States	20:50
7	Merima Denboba	Ethiopia	20:53
8	Rose Cheruiyot	Kenya	20:54
9	Albertina Dias	Portugal	20:56
10	Gabriela Szabo	Romania	20:57
11	Catherine Kirui	Kenya	20:58
12	Zahra Ouaziz	Morocco	21:06
13	Olga Bondarenko	Russia	21:06
14	Olga Appell	United States	21:07
15	Yukiko Okamoto	Japan	21:07
16	Julia Vaquero	Spain	21:12
17	Hellen Kimaiyo	Kenya	21:13
18	Paula Radcliffe	United Kingdom	21:14
19	Annette Palluy	France	21:15
20	Kanako Haginaga	Japan	21:17
21	Carmen Fuentes	Spain	21:18
22	Tudorita Chidu	Romania	21:19
23	Elena Fidatof	Romania	21:20
24	Bev Hartigan	United Kingdom	21:21
25	Askale Bereda	Ethiopia	21:22
26	Genet Gebregiorgis	Ethiopia	21:23
27	Hellen Chepngeno	Kenya	21:24
28	Alla Zhilyayeva	Russia	21:24
29	Iulia Negura	Romania	21:25
30	Cristina Misaros	Romania	21:25
31	Naomi Sakashita	Japan	21:27
32	Natalya Solominskaya	Russia	21:29
33	Rosanna Martin	Italy	21:29
34	Nyla Carroll	New Zealand	21:31
35	Anne Cross	Australia	21:31
36	Yuko Kawakami	Japan	21:31
37	Gwyn Coogan	United States	21:32
38	Estela Estévez	Spain	21:34
39	Kathy Butler	Canada	21:35
40	Yang Siyu	China	21:36
41	Rosario Murcia	France	21:36
42	Laurence Duquénoy	France	21:37
43	Nadezhda Tatarenkova	Russia	21:37
44	Alison Wyeth	United Kingdom	21:38
45	Leah Pells	Canada	21:38
46	Stefanija Statkuvienė	Lithuania	21:39
47	Ana Correia	Portugal	21:39
48	Roseli Machado	Brazil	21:41
49	Blandine Bitzner-Ducret	France	21:42
50	Garifa Kuku	Kazakhstan	21:42
51	Ana Dias	Portugal	21:44
52	Emma Carney	Australia	21:45
53	Tatyana Belovol	Ukraine	21:45
54	Katy McCandless	United States	21:45
55	Daria Nauer	Switzerland	21:46
56	Masako Saito	Japan	21:46
57	Regina Chistyakova	Lithuania	21:47
58	Rocío Ríos	Spain	21:48
59	Dorthe Rasmussen	Denmark	21:48
60	Tamara Koba	Ukraine	21:49
61	Anne Keenan-Buckley	Ireland	21:50
62	Liz Wilson	United States	21:50
63	Liève Slegers	Belgium	21:51
64	Laurence Vivier	France	21:52
65	Silvia Sommaggio	Italy	21:52
66	Annemarie Danneels	Belgium	21:53
67	Carmen Troncoso	United States	21:53
68	Ana Oliveira	Portugal	21:54
69	Atsumi Yashima	Japan	21:55
70	Maria Curatolo	Italy	21:58
71	Nina Belikova	Russia	21:58
72	Nives Curti	Italy	21:59
73	Natalya Galushko	Belarus	22:00
74	Angela White	Australia	22:02
75	Desana Sourková	Czech Republic	22:03
76	Alta Verster	South Africa	22:03
77	Getenesh Urge	Ethiopia	22:05
78	Angie Hulley	United Kingdom	22:07
79	Kerryn McCann	Australia	22:08
80	Carla Sacramento	Portugal	22:08
81	Rosa Oliveira	Portugal	22:08
82	Natalia Azpiazu	Spain	22:09
83	Lucy Elliott	United Kingdom	22:09
84	Ingrid van Giel	Belgium	22:09
85	Daniela Bran	Romania	22:10
86	Maria Rébélo	France	22:10
87	Anchen Rose	South Africa	22:11
88	Martha Ernstdóttir	Iceland	22:11
89	Orietta Mancia	Italy	22:12
90	Viktoria Nenasheva	Russia	22:13
91	Teresa Duffy	Ireland	22:14
92	Anja Smolders	Belgium	22:19
93	Vera Ragulina	Ukraine	22:20
94	Helle Vullings	Netherlands	22:22
95	Tamara Salomon	Canada	22:23
96	Mieke Aanen	Netherlands	22:25
97	Agata Balsamo	Italy	22:25
98	Jill Bruce	Ireland	22:26
99	Sandra Lotter	South Africa	22:28
100	Ilona Barbanova	Ukraine	22:28
101	Cathy Schum	Ireland	22:29
102	Andrea Duke	United Kingdom	22:31
103	Elisabeth Mongudhi	Namibia	22:33
104	Juliet Prowse	South Africa	22:36
105	Clare Carney	Australia	22:37
106	Mary Donohoe	Ireland	22:38
107	Deanna Arnhill	Canada	22:42
108	Solange de Souza	Brazil	22:47
109	Marina Nascimento	Brazil	22:49
110	Stella Castro	Colombia	22:49
111	Irina Mikitenko	Kazakhstan	22:58
112	Hao Jianhua	China	23:02
113	Wu Mei	China	23:07
114	Gwen Griffiths	South Africa	23:17
115	Jacqueline Martín	Spain	23:18
116	Carol Galea	Malta	23:18
117	Mara Zuzul	Croatia	23:18
118	Melody Marcus	South Africa	23:20
119	Esneda Londono	Colombia	23:21
120	Ulla Marquette	Canada	23:27
121	Olga Pivovarova	Kazakhstan	23:33
122	Miryam Pulido	Colombia	23:33
123	Evette Turner	Jamaica	23:42
124	Cecilia Rojas	Colombia	23:44
125	Maria Santana	Brazil	23:45
126	Irina Matrosova	Uzbekistan	23:49
127	Nadir de Siqueira	Brazil	23:51
128	Yelena Gorbulya	Kazakhstan	24:08
129	Janice Turner	Jamaica	24:38
130	Josiane Nairac-Boullé	Mauritius	25:01
131	Lee Hsiao-Chuan	Chinese Taipei	25:07
132	Michelle Clarke	Jamaica	25:34
133	Nicole Carty	Jamaica	26:33
134	Lilian López	Paraguay	28:05
135	Finette Didon	Seychelles	30:01

==== Teams ====
Rank	Team	Points
1st place, gold medalist(s)	Kenya: Sally Barsosio / 3; Margaret Ngotho / 4; Rose Cheruiyot / 8; Catherine Kirui / 11; (Hellen Kimaiyo) / (17); (Hellen Chepngeno) / (27)	26
2nd place, silver medalist(s)	Ethiopia: Derartu Tulu / 1; Gete Wami / 5; Merima Denboba / 7; Askale Bereda / 25; (Genet Gebregiorgis) / (26); (Getenesh Urge) / (77)	38
3rd place, bronze medalist(s)	Romania: Gabriela Szabo / 10; Tudorita Chidu / 22; Elena Fidatof / 23; Iulia Negura / 29; (Cristina Misaros) / (30); (Daniela Bran) / (85)	84
4	Japan: Yukiko Okamoto / 15; Kanako Haginaga / 20; Naomi Sakashita / 31; Yuko Kawakami / 36; (Masako Saito) / (56); (Atsumi Yashima) / (69)	102
5	United States: Joan Nesbit / 6; Olga Appell / 14; Gwynn Coogan / 37; Katy McCandless / 54; (Liz Wilson) / (62); (Carmen Troncoso) / (67)	111
6	Russia: Olga Bondarenko / 13; Alla Zhilyayeva / 28; Natalya Solominskaya / 32; Nadezhda Tatarenkova / 43; (Nina Belikova) / (71); (Viktoria Nenasheva) / (90)	116
7	Spain: Julia Vaquero / 16; Carmen Fuentes / 21; Estela Estévez / 38; Rocío Ríos / 58; (Natalia Azpiazu) / (82); (Jacqueline Martín) / (115)	133
8	France: Annette Palluy / 19; Rosario Murcia / 41; Laurence Duquénoy / 42; Blandine Bitzner-Ducret / 49; (Laurence Vivier) / (64); (Maria Rébélo) / (86)	151
9	United Kingdom: Paula Radcliffe / 18; Bev Hartigan / 24; Alison Wyeth / 44; Angie Hulley / 78; (Lucy Elliott) / (83); (Andrea Duke) / (102)	164
10	Portugal: Albertina Dias / 9; Ana Correia / 47; Ana Dias / 51; Ana Oliveira / 68; (Carla Sacramento) / (80); (Rosa Oliveira) / (81)	175
11	Italy: Rosanna Martin / 33; Silvia Sommaggio / 65; Maria Curatolo / 70; Nives Curti / 72; (Orietta Mancia) / (89); (Agata Balsamo) / (97)	240
12	Australia: Anne Cross / 35; Emma Carney / 52; Angela White / 74; Kerryn McCann / 79; (Clare Carney) / (105)	240
13	Ireland: Catherina McKiernan / 2; Anne Keenan-Buckley / 61; Teresa Duffy / 91; Jill Bruce / 98; (Cathy Schum) / (101); (Mary Donohoe) / (106)	252
14	Canada: Kathy Butler / 39; Leah Pells / 45; Tamara Salomon / 95; Deanna Arnhill / 107; (Ulla Marquette) / (120)	286
15	Belgium: Liève Slegers / 63; Annemarie Danneels / 66; Ingrid van Giel / 84; Anja Smolders / 92	305
16	Ukraine: Tatyana Belovol / 53; Tamara Koba / 60; Vera Ragulina / 93; Ilona Barbanova / 100	306
17	South Africa: Alta Verster / 76; Anchen Rose / 87; Sandra Lotter / 99; Juliet Prowse / 104; (Gwen Griffiths) / (114); (Melody Marcus) / (118)	366
18	Brazil: Roseli Machado / 48; Solange de Souza / 108; Marina Nascimento / 109; Maria Santana / 125; (Nadir de Siqueira) / (127)	390
19	Kazakhstan: Garifa Kuku / 50; Irina Mikitenko / 111; Olga Pivovarova / 121; Yelena Gorbulya / 128	410
20	Colombia: Stella Castro / 110; Esneda Londono / 119; Miryam Pulido / 122; Cecilia Rojas / 124	475
21	Jamaica: Evette Turner / 123; Janice Turner / 129; Michelle Clarke / 132; Nicole Carty / 133	517

- Note: Athletes in parentheses did not score for the team result

== Participation ==
An unofficial count yields the participation of 135 athletes from 39 countries in the Senior women's race. This is in agreement with the official numbers as published.

- Australia (5)
- Belarus (1)
- Belgium (4)
- Brazil (5)
- Canada (5)
- China (3)
- Chinese Taipei (1)
- Colombia (4)
- Croatia (1)
- Czech Republic (1)
- Denmark (1)
- Ethiopia (6)
- France (6)
- Iceland (1)
- Ireland (6)
- Italy (6)
- Jamaica (4)
- Japan (6)
- Kazakhstan (4)
- Kenya (6)
- Lithuania (2)
- Malta (1)
- Mauritius (1)
- Morocco (1)
- Namibia (1)
- Netherlands (2)
- New Zealand (1)
- Paraguay (1)
- Portugal (6)
- Romania (6)
- Russia (6)
- Seychelles (1)
- South Africa (6)
- Spain (6)
- Switzerland (1)
- Ukraine (4)
- United Kingdom (6)
- United States (6)
- Uzbekistan (1)

== See also ==
- 1995 IAAF World Cross Country Championships – Senior men's race
- 1995 IAAF World Cross Country Championships – Junior men's race
- 1995 IAAF World Cross Country Championships – Junior women's race
