= 1990 IAAF World Cross Country Championships – Junior women's race =

Junior women's race at the 1990 IAAF World Cross Country Championships
- Organisers: IAAF
- Edition: 18th
- Date: March 25
- Host city: Aix-les-Bains, Rhône-Alpes, France
- Venue: Hippodrome de Marlioz
- Events: 1
- Distances: 4.4 km – Junior women
- Participation: 121 athletes from 27 nations

The Junior women's race at the 1990 IAAF World Cross Country Championships was held in Aix-les-Bains, France, at the Hippodrome de Marlioz on March 25, 1990. A report on the event was given in the Glasgow Herald.

Complete results, medallists, and the results of British athletes were published.

== Race results ==
=== Junior women's race (4.4 km) ===
==== Individual ====
Rank	Athlete	Country	Time
1st place, gold medalist(s)	Liu Shixiang	China	14:19
2nd place, silver medalist(s)	Yan Qinglan	China	14:20
3rd place, bronze medalist(s)	Susan Chepkemei	Kenya	14:22
4	Caroline Kwambai	Kenya	14:23
5	Lina Chesire	Kenya	14:25
6	Tamara Salomon	Canada	14:27
7	Malin Ewerlöf	Sweden	14:30
8	Ann Mwangi	Kenya	14:30
9	Minori Hayakari	Japan	14:32
10	Shiki Terasaki	Japan	14:35
11	Yumi Osaki	Japan	14:35
12	Melody Fairchild	United States	14:37
13	Jane Ekimat	Kenya	14:37
14	Natsue Koikawa	Japan	14:39
15	Janeth Caizalitín	Ecuador	14:43
16	Tegla Loroupe	Kenya	14:49
17	Zhor El Kamch	Morocco	14:49
18	Makiko Okamoto	Japan	14:54
19	Brynhild Synstnes	Norway	14:55
20	Dorothy Mambrue	Zambia	14:55
21	Sandra Ruales	Ecuador	14:56
22	Alice Chanda	Zambia	14:57
23	Jamie Park	United States	14:57
24	Carmen Naranjo	Ecuador	15:00
25	Yelena Zhilkina	Soviet Union	15:00
26	Soledad Nieto	Ecuador	15:01
27	Liu Xian	China	15:01
28	Mihaela Ciu	Romania	15:02
29	Andrea Whitcombe	United Kingdom	15:02
30	Hozumi Otani	Japan	15:02
31	Najat Ouali	Morocco	15:03
32	Simona Staicu	Romania	15:04
33	Andrea Duke	United Kingdom	15:04
34	Natalya Galushko	Soviet Union	15:05
35	María Isabel Martinez	Spain	15:06
36	Maria Silvia Pili	Italy	15:07
37	Ana Gimeno	Spain	15:08
38	Liu Yianying	China	15:09
39	Inna Kozina	Soviet Union	15:09
40	Carla Sacramento	Portugal	15:12
41	Gillian Stacey	United Kingdom	15:15
42	Hayley Haining	United Kingdom	15:16
43	Beni Gras	Canada	15:16
44	Anikó Javos	Hungary	15:19
45	Maria Luisa Madera	Spain	15:21
46	Li Libin	China	15:23
47	Andrea Bertoia	Canada	15:23
48	Paola Cabrera	Mexico	15:23
49	Yelena Susina	Soviet Union	15:24
50	Malika El Habti	Morocco	15:25
51	Nathalie Braem	France	15:26
52	Jennifer Armstrong	Canada	15:27
53	Ana Nanu	Romania	15:28
54	Fabia Trabaldo	Italy	15:29
55	Rachida Benmansour	Morocco	15:30
56	Patricia Lossouarn	France	15:31
57	Norma Torres	Ecuador	15:33
58	Louise Watson	United Kingdom	15:37
59	Kathy Butler	Canada	15:38
60	Kerry Mackay	United Kingdom	15:39
61	Miriam Achote	Ecuador	15:40
62	Carmen Fülop	Romania	15:41
63	Ingeborg Huijssen	Belgium	15:42
64	Renata Kuleta	Poland	15:42
65	Ursula Jeitzinger	Switzerland	15:43
66	Svenja Lütje	West Germany	15:44
67	Ursula Friedmann	West Germany	15:44
68	Mónika Tóth	Hungary	15:45
69	Marina Nascimento	Brazil	15:45
70	Amina Maanaoui	Morocco	15:46
71	Simona Viola	Italy	15:49
72	Deena Drossin	United States	15:49
73	Irina Volynskaya	Soviet Union	15:51
74	Celine Martin	France	15:52
75	Fátima Cabral	Portugal	15:53
76	Josefina Gutierrez	Spain	15:54
77	Yolanda Vidal	Spain	15:55
78	Szilvia Csoszánszky	Hungary	15:55
79	Renáta Fülöp	Hungary	15:56
80	Teresa Ferreira	Portugal	15:56
81	Carla Azeitero	Portugal	15:57
82	Stela Apetre	Romania	15:58
83	Francoise Nemry	Belgium	15:59
84	Elzbieta Konak	Poland	16:00
85	Valerie Collignon	Belgium	16:00
86	Carolina Matteucci	Italy	16:01
87	Marie France Barreiro	Spain	16:04
88	Christine Stief	West Germany	16:07
89	Helene Gilliet	France	16:08
90	Rebecca Spies	United States	16:09
91	Marta Kosmowska	Poland	16:10
92	Gaëlle Houitte	France	16:12
93	Meghan O'Brian	Canada	16:12
94	Nathalie Deroubaix	Belgium	16:13
95	Vidya Deoghare	India	16:14
96	Shelly Smathers	United States	16:16
97	Caroline McLoughlin	Ireland	16:19
98	Ornella Brion	Italy	16:19
99	Shubangi Kadan	India	16:20
100	Rebecca Werneck	Brazil	16:20
101	Anna Brzezińska	Poland	16:21
102	Vanessa Molloy	Ireland	16:23
103	Viktória Barta	Hungary	16:25
104	Marina Bastos	Portugal	16:26
105	Amy Giblin	United States	16:27
106	Patricia Jossot	France	16:27
107	Petra Krodinger	West Germany	16:28
108	Barbara Stewart	Jamaica	16:37
109	Ana Costa	Portugal	16:38
110	Andrea Tschopp	Switzerland	16:39
111	Peggy van Eeckhoudt	Belgium	16:40
112	Glynnis Lynch	Ireland	16:50
113	Suzie Bent	Jamaica	16:51
114	Bhageerathi Bille	India	16:52
115	Faith Dawkins	Jamaica	16:58
116	Christina Geoghegan	Ireland	16:59
117	Maria Carla Pagano	Italy	17:02
118	Annick van Daele	Belgium	17:09
119	Emer Molloy	Ireland	17:25
120	Vaishali Khamker	India	17:39
121	Myrsel Chambers	Jamaica	18:04

==== Teams ====
Rank	Team	Points
1st place, gold medalist(s)	Kenya: Susan Chepkemei / 3; Caroline Kwambai / 4; Lina Chesire / 5; Ann Mwangi / 8; (Jane Ekimat) / (13); (Tegla Loroupe) / (16)	20
2nd place, silver medalist(s)	Japan: Minori Hayakari / 9; Shiki Terasaki / 10; Yumi Osaki / 11; Natsue Koikawa / 14; (Makiko Okamoto) / (18); (Hozumi Otani) / (30)	44
3rd place, bronze medalist(s)	China: Liu Shixiang / 1; Yan Qinglan / 2; Liu Xian / 27; Liu Yianying / 38; (Li Libin) / (46)	68
4	Ecuador: Janeth Caizalitín / 15; Sandra Ruales / 21; Carmen Naranjo / 24; Soledad Nieto / 26; (Norma Torres) / (57); (Miriam Achote) / (61)	86
5	United Kingdom: Andrea Whitcombe / 29; Andrea Duke / 33; Gillian Stacey / 41; Hayley Haining / 42; (Louise Watson) / (58); (Kerry Mackay) / (60)	145
6	Soviet Union: Yelena Zhilkina / 25; Natalya Galushko / 34; Inna Kozina / 39; Yelena Susina / 49; (Irina Volynskaya) / (73)	147
7	Canada: Tamara Salomon / 6; Beni Gras / 43; Andrea Bertoia / 47; Jennifer Armstrong / 52; (Kathy Butler) / (59); (Meghan O'Brian) / (93)	148
8	Morocco: Zhor El Kamch / 17; Najat Ouali / 31; Malika El Habti / 50; Rachida Benmansour / 55; (Amina Maanaoui) / (70)	153
9	Romania: Mihaela Ciu / 28; Simona Staicu / 32; Ana Nanu / 53; Carmen Fülop / 62; (Stela Apetre) / (82)	175
10	Spain: María Isabel Martinez / 35; Ana Gimeno / 37; Maria Luisa Madera / 45; Josefina Gutierrez / 76; (Yolanda Vidal) / (77); (Marie France Barreiro) / (87)	193
11	United States: Melody Fairchild / 12; Jamie Park / 23; Deena Drossin / 72; Rebecca Spies / 90; (Shelly Smathers) / (96); (Amy Giblin) / (105)	197
12	Italy: Maria Silvia Pili / 36; Fabia Trabaldo / 54; Simona Viola / 71; Carolina Matteucci / 86; (Ornella Brion) / (98); (Maria Carla Pagano) / (117)	247
13	Hungary: Anikó Javos / 44; Mónika Tóth / 68; Szilvia Csoszánszky / 78; Renáta Fülöp / 79; (Viktória Barta) / (103)	269
14	France: Nathalie Braem / 51; Patricia Lossouarn / 56; Celine Martin / 74; Helene Gilliet / 89; (Gaëlle Houitte) / (92); (Patricia Jossot) / (106)	270
15	Portugal: Carla Sacramento / 40; Fátima Cabral / 75; Teresa Ferreira / 80; Carla Azeitero / 81; (Marina Bastos) / (104); (Ana Costa) / (109)	276
16	Belgium: Ingeborg Huijssen / 63; Francoise Nemry / 83; Valerie Collignon / 85; Nathalie Deroubaix / 94; (Peggy van Eeckhoudt) / (111); (Annick van Daele) / (118)	325
17	West Germany: Svenja Lütje / 66; Ursula Friedmann / 67; Christine Stief / 88; Petra Krodinger / 107	328
18	Poland: Renata Kuleta / 64; Elzbieta Konak / 84; Marta Kosmowska / 91; Anna Brzezińska / 101	340
19	Ireland: Caroline McLoughlin / 97; Vanessa Molloy / 102; Glynnis Lynch / 112; Christina Geoghegan / 116; (Emer Molloy) / (119)	427
20	India: Vidya Deoghare / 95; Shubangi Kadan / 99; Bhageerathi Bille / 114; Vaishali Khamker / 120	428
21	Jamaica: Barbara Stewart / 108; Suzie Bent / 113; Faith Dawkins / 115; Myrsel Chambers / 121	457

- Note: Athletes in parentheses did not score for the team result

== Participation ==
An unofficial count yields the participation of 121 athletes from 27 countries in the Junior women's race. This is in agreement with the official numbers as published.

- Belgium (6)
- Brazil (2)
- Canada (6)
- China (5)
- Ecuador (6)
- France (6)
- Hungary (5)
- India (4)
- Ireland (5)
- Italy (6)
- Jamaica (4)
- Japan (6)
- Kenya (6)
- Mexico (1)
- Morocco (5)
- Norway (1)
- Poland (4)
- Portugal (6)
- Romania (5)
- Soviet Union (5)
- Spain (6)
- Sweden (1)
- Switzerland (2)
- United Kingdom (6)
- United States (6)
- West Germany (4)
- Zambia (2)

== See also ==
- 1990 IAAF World Cross Country Championships – Senior men's race
- 1990 IAAF World Cross Country Championships – Junior men's race
- 1990 IAAF World Cross Country Championships – Senior women's race
