= Seoul International Women's Ekiden =

1992–2003 relay race in South Korea

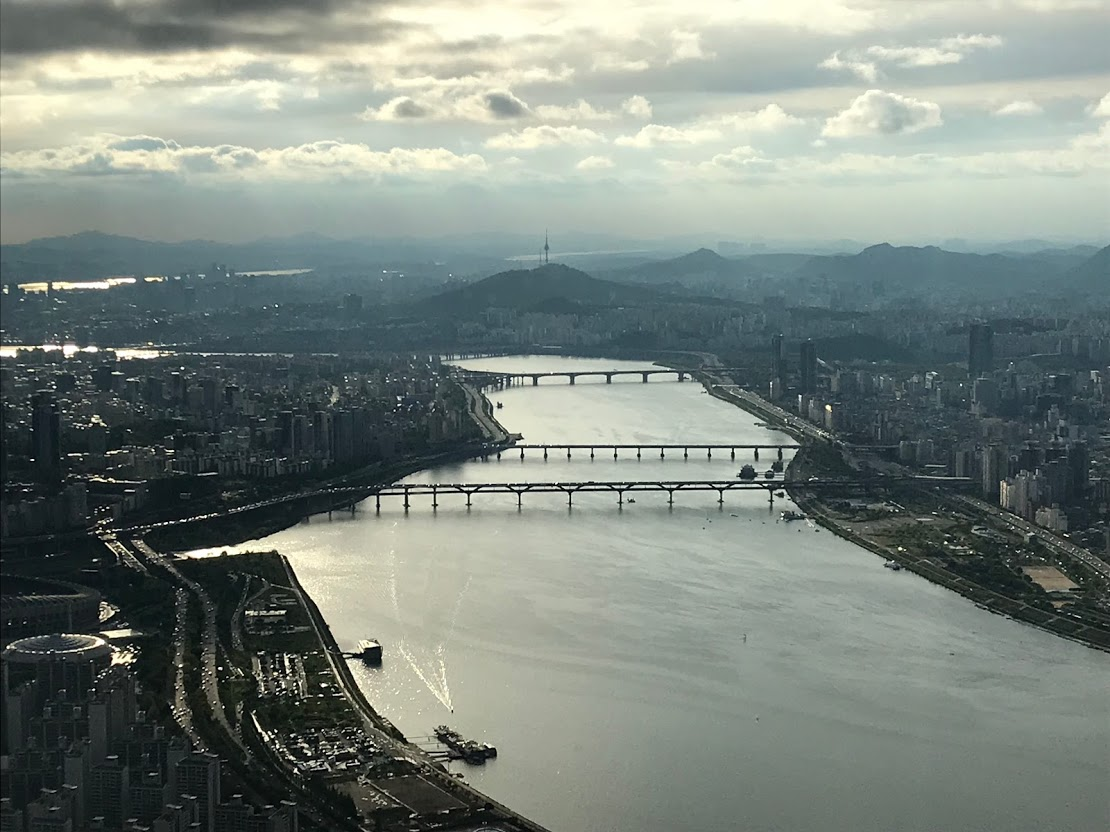
The Han River, along which the 1988 Olympic marathon and Seoul Ekiden was run

The Seoul International Women's Ekiden (Korean: 서울 여자 역전경주; 서울 역전 경기), also known as the Seoul International Women's Road Relay or the Seoul Ekiden, was an international women's ekiden (marathon relay race) held in Seoul, South Korea.

== History ==
The event was founded in 1992, four years after the 1988 Summer Olympics were held in Seoul. Following events like America's Ekiden, it was one of a series of high-profile ekidens held outside Japan in the late 1980s and early 1990s. Athletes competed representing their country in a seven-stage race with some others like the Japanese corporate team and national 'B' teams also competing. All editions were for women only and held on the Seoul Olympic marathon course. After an inaugural win by Kenya, "Ma's Army" (the Chinese national team led by Ma Junren) won the 1993 race, setting a course record of 2:13:14 that remains over four minutes faster than any other team's performance in the race's history.

Following the first two editions, the Seoul Ekiden was won by Russia 9 times in a row from 1994 to 2003 (the race was not held in 1997). The race was not held after 2003.

== Winners ==
Seoul Ekiden winning teams (7-stage race)
| Ed. | Date | Athletes | Split | Team | Time | Ref |
|---|---|---|---|---|---|---|
| 1st | 12 April 1992 | Esther Kiplagat | 19:52 | Kenya | 2:17:08 (marathon) | |
| 1st | 12 April 1992 | Helen Chepngeno | 19:48 | Kenya | 2:17:08 (marathon) | |
| 1st | 12 April 1992 | Tegla Loroupe | 26:29 | Kenya | 2:17:08 (marathon) | |
| 1st | 12 April 1992 | Helen Kimaiyo Kipkoskei | 21:44 | Kenya | 2:17:08 (marathon) | |
| 1st | 12 April 1992 | Salina Chirchir Kimaiyo | 16:50 | Kenya | 2:17:08 (marathon) | |
| 1st | 12 April 1992 | Pauline Konga | 19:18 | Kenya | 2:17:08 (marathon) | |
| 1st | 12 April 1992 | Margaret Kagiri | 13:07 | Kenya | 2:17:08 (marathon) | |
| 2nd | 10 April 1993 | Zhang Linli | 18:53 | China | 2:13:14 (marathon) | |
| 2nd | 10 April 1993 | Wang Xu | 19:27 | China | 2:13:14 (marathon) | |
| 2nd | 10 April 1993 | Zhang Lirong | 24:50 | China | 2:13:14 (marathon) | |
| 2nd | 10 April 1993 | Wang Junxia | 21:20 | China | 2:13:14 (marathon) | |
| 2nd | 10 April 1993 | Feng Wenhui | 15:59 | China | 2:13:14 (marathon) | |
| 2nd | 10 April 1993 | Gu Dongmei | 19:20 | China | 2:13:14 (marathon) | |
| 2nd | 10 April 1993 | Unknown | 13:25 | China | 2:13:14 (marathon) | |
| 3rd | 10 April 1994 | Nina Belikova | 19:53 | Russia | 2:17:16 (marathon) | |
| 3rd | 10 April 1994 | Nadezhda Galyamova | 19:41 | Russia | 2:17:16 (marathon) | |
| 3rd | 10 April 1994 | Unknown | 26:44 | Russia | 2:17:16 (marathon) | |
| 3rd | 10 April 1994 | Tatyana Pentukova | 22:55 | Russia | 2:17:16 (marathon) | |
| 3rd | 10 April 1994 | Elena Romanova | 15:56 | Russia | 2:17:16 (marathon) | |
| 3rd | 10 April 1994 | Olga Churbanova | 18:53 | Russia | 2:17:16 (marathon) | |
| 3rd | 10 April 1994 | Ebru Kavaklioglu Kopytova | 13:14 | Russia | 2:17:16 (marathon) | |
| 4th | 9 April 1995 | Nina Belikova | 20:26 | Russia | 2:18:52 (marathon) | |
| 4th | 9 April 1995 | Nadezhda Tatarenkova | 20:21 | Russia | 2:18:52 (marathon) | |
| 4th | 9 April 1995 | Alla Zhilyayeva | 26:43 | Russia | 2:18:52 (marathon) | |
| 4th | 9 April 1995 | Olga Bondarenko Krentser | 21:46 | Russia | 2:18:52 (marathon) | |
| 4th | 9 April 1995 | Viktoriya Nenasheva | 16:04 | Russia | 2:18:52 (marathon) | |
| 4th | 9 April 1995 | Unknown | 20:00 | Russia | 2:18:52 (marathon) | |
| 4th | 9 April 1995 | Elena Pellois Baranova | 13:32 | Russia | 2:18:52 (marathon) | |
| 5th | 7 April 1996 | Unknown | | Russia | 2:19:27 (marathon) | |
| 5th | 7 April 1996 | Unknown | | Russia | 2:19:27 (marathon) | |
| 5th | 7 April 1996 | Unknown | | Russia | 2:19:27 (marathon) | |
| 5th | 7 April 1996 | Unknown | | Russia | 2:19:27 (marathon) | |
| 5th | 7 April 1996 | Unknown | | Russia | 2:19:27 (marathon) | |
| 5th | 7 April 1996 | Unknown | | Russia | 2:19:27 (marathon) | |
| 5th | 7 April 1996 | Unknown | | Russia | 2:19:27 (marathon) | |
Not held in 1997
| 6th | 12 April 1998 | Unknown | | Russia | 2:21:16 (marathon) | |
| 6th | 12 April 1998 | Unknown | | Russia | 2:21:16 (marathon) | |
| 6th | 12 April 1998 | Unknown | | Russia | 2:21:16 (marathon) | |
| 6th | 12 April 1998 | Unknown | | Russia | 2:21:16 (marathon) | |
| 6th | 12 April 1998 | Unknown | | Russia | 2:21:16 (marathon) | |
| 6th | 12 April 1998 | Unknown | | Russia | 2:21:16 (marathon) | |
| 6th | 12 April 1998 | Unknown | | Russia | 2:21:16 (marathon) | |
| 7th | 11 April 1999 | Unknown | | Russia | 2:20:37 (marathon) | |
| 7th | 11 April 1999 | Unknown | | Russia | 2:20:37 (marathon) | |
| 7th | 11 April 1999 | Klara Kachapova | 27:03 | Russia | 2:20:37 (marathon) | |
| 7th | 11 April 1999 | Tatyana Titova | 22:41 | Russia | 2:20:37 (marathon) | |
| 7th | 11 April 1999 | Oxana Jelezniak | 16:53 | Russia | 2:20:37 (marathon) | |
| 7th | 11 April 1999 | Olga Yegorova | 20:02 | Russia | 2:20:37 (marathon) | |
| 7th | 11 April 1999 | Unknown | | Russia | 2:20:37 (marathon) | |
| 8th | 9 April 2000 | Lidiya Vasilevskaya | 20:17 | Russia | 2:21:37 (marathon) | |
| 8th | 9 April 2000 | Svetlana Baygulova | 21:06 | Russia | 2:21:37 (marathon) | |
| 8th | 9 April 2000 | Madina Biktagirova | 27:31 | Russia | 2:21:37 (marathon) | |
| 8th | 9 April 2000 | Anastasia Zubova | 16:41 | Russia | 2:21:37 (marathon) | |
| 8th | 9 April 2000 | Lyudmila Biktasheva | 20:20 | Russia | 2:21:37 (marathon) | |
| 8th | 9 April 2000 | Lidiya Grigoryeva | 22:25 | Russia | 2:21:37 (marathon) | |
| 8th | 9 April 2000 | Galina Bogomolova | 13:17 | Russia | 2:21:37 (marathon) | |
| 9th | 8 April 2001 | Anastasia Zubova | 19:20 | Russia | 2:17:37 (marathon) | |
| 9th | 8 April 2001 | Lyudmila Biktasheva | 20:13 | Russia | 2:17:37 (marathon) | |
| 9th | 8 April 2001 | Sylvia Skvortsova | 26:32 | Russia | 2:17:37 (marathon) | |
| 9th | 8 April 2001 | Galina Aleksandrova | 22:20 | Russia | 2:17:37 (marathon) | |
| 9th | 8 April 2001 | Elena Zadorozhnaya | 15:47 | Russia | 2:17:37 (marathon) | |
| 9th | 8 April 2001 | Olga Yegorova | 19:49 | Russia | 2:17:37 (marathon) | |
| 9th | 8 April 2001 | Elena Burykina | 13:36 | Russia | 2:17:37 (marathon) | |
| 10th | 7 April 2002 | Anastasia Zubova | 19:13 | Russia | 2:18:24 (marathon) | |
| 10th | 7 April 2002 | Nina Belikova | 20:46 | Russia | 2:18:24 (marathon) | |
| 10th | 7 April 2002 | Viktoriya Klimina | 26:32 | Russia | 2:18:24 (marathon) | |
| 10th | 7 April 2002 | Olga Romanova | 22:20 | Russia | 2:18:24 (marathon) | |
| 10th | 7 April 2002 | Elena Zadorozhnaya | 16:06 | Russia | 2:18:24 (marathon) | |
| 10th | 7 April 2002 | Liliya Shobukhova Volkova | 19:26 | Russia | 2:18:24 (marathon) | |
| 10th | 7 April 2002 | Tatyana Chulakh | 14:01 | Russia | 2:18:24 (marathon) | |
| 11th | 6 April 2003 | Anastasia Zubova | 19:58 | Russia | 2:18:06 (marathon) | |
| 11th | 6 April 2003 | Galina Aleksandrova | 19:50 | Russia | 2:18:06 (marathon) | |
| 11th | 6 April 2003 | Alla Zhilyayeva | 26:14 | Russia | 2:18:06 (marathon) | |
| 11th | 6 April 2003 | Galina Bogomolova | 22:14 | Russia | 2:18:06 (marathon) | |
| 11th | 6 April 2003 | Oksana Belyakova Barak | 16:18 | Russia | 2:18:06 (marathon) | |
| 11th | 6 April 2003 | Viktoriya Klimina | 20:05 | Russia | 2:18:06 (marathon) | |
| 11th | 6 April 2003 | Elena Sipatova Chemyshova | 13:47 | Russia | 2:18:06 (marathon) | |

== Stage bests ==
Best stage times per year (7-stage race)
| Year | Stage 1 | | | Stage 2 | | | Stage 3 | | | Stage 4 | | | Stage 5 | | | Stage 6 | | | Stage 7 | | |
| Year | Distance | Best time | Athlete | Distance | Best time | Athlete | Distance | Best time | Athlete | Distance | Best time | Athlete | Distance | Best time | Athlete | Distance | Best time | Athlete | Distance | Best time | Athlete |
|---|---|---|---|---|---|---|---|---|---|---|---|---|---|---|---|---|---|---|---|---|---|
| 1992 | 6 km | 19:52 | Esther Kiplagat (KEN) | 6 km | 19:48 | Helen Chepngeno (KEN) | 8 km | 26:29 | Tegla Loroupe (KEN) | 7 km | 21:44 | Helen Kimaiyo Kipkoskei (KEN) | 5 km | 16:16 | Dörte Köster (GER) | 6 km | 19:11 | Natalya Sorokivaskaya (KAZ) | 4.195 km | 13:07 | Margaret Kagiri (KEN) |
| 1993 | 6 km | 18:53 | Zhang Linli (CHN) | 6 km | 19:27 | Wang Xu (CHN) | 8 km | 24:50 | Zhang Lirong (CHN) | 7 km | 21:20 | Wang Junxia (CHN) | 5 km | 15:59 | Feng Wenhui (CHN) | 6 km | 19:20 | Gu Dongmei (CHN) | 4.195 km | 13:13 | Margareta Keszeg (ROM) |
| 1994 | 6 km | 19:52 | Oh Mi-ja (KOR) | 6 km | 19:39 | Jung Young-im (KOR) | 8 km | 26:44 | Natalya Sorokivaskaya (KAZ) | 7 km | 22:39 | Renata Paradowska Sobiesiak (POL) | 5 km | 15:56 | Elena Romanova (RUS) | 6 km | 18:53 | Olga Churbanova (RUS) | 4.195 km | 13:14 | Ebru Kavaklioglu Kopytova (RUS) |
| 1995 | 6 km | | | 6 km | 20:11 | Maria del Carmen Diaz Mancilla (MEX) | 8 km | 26:43 | Alla Zhilyayeva (RUS) | 7 km | 21:46 | Olga Bondarenko Krentser (RUS) | 5 km | 16:04 | Viktoriya Nenasheva (RUS) | 6 km | 19:19 | J Barsosio Chepkemboi (KEN) | 4.195 km | 13:32 | Elena Pellois Baranova (RUS) |
| 1996 | 6 km | | | 6 km | | | 8 km | | | 7 km | | | 5 km | | | 6 km | | | 4.195 km | | |
| 1998 | 6 km | | | 6 km | | | 8 km | | | 7 km | | | 5 km | | | 6 km | | | 4.195 km | | |
| 1999 | 6 km | 19:57 | Lyubov Klochko (UKR) | 6 km | 19:49 | Dong Zhaoxia (CHN) | 8 km | 26:49 | Satomi Matsuo (JPN) | 7 km | 22:41 | Tatyana Titova (RUS) | 5 km | | | 6 km | 20:02 | Olga Yegorova (RUS) | 4.195 km | 13:46 | Irina Sklyarenko (UKR) |
| 2000 | 6 km | 20:00 | Elena Fidatov (ROM) | 6 km | 19:49 | Lu Cui (CHN) | 8 km | 27:31 | Madina Biktagirova (RUS) | 7 km | 22:25 | Lidiya Grigoryeva (RUS) | 5 km | 16:10 | Maria-Mihaela Prundus Botezan (ROM) | 6 km | 20:20 | Lyudmila Biktasheva (RUS) | 4.195 km | 13:17 | Galina Bogomolova (RUS) |
| 2001 | 6 km | 19:04 | Li Meihua (CHN) | 6 km | 19:37 | Kyoko Katafuchi (JPN) | 8 km | 26:31 | Adriana Fernandez Miranda (MEX) | 7 km | 22:20 | Galina Aleksandrova (RUS) | 5 km | 15:47 | Elena Zadorozhnaya (RUS) | 6 km | 19:49 | Olga Yegorova (RUS) | 4.195 km | 13:36 | Elena Burykina (RUS) |
| 2002 | 6 km | 19:13 | Anastasia Zubova (RUS) | 6 km | 20:01 | Kyoko Katafuchi (JPN) | 8 km | 26:32 | Viktoriya Klimina (RUS) | 7 km | 22:20 | Olga Romanova (RUS) | 5 km | 16:06 | Elena Zadorozhnaya (RUS) | 6 km | 19:26 | Liliya Shobukhova Volkova (RUS) | 4.195 km | 13:52 | Maryna Dubrova (UKR) |
| 2003 | 6 km | 19:58 | Anastasia Zubova (RUS) | 6 km | 19:50 | Galina Aleksandrova (RUS) | 8 km | 26:14 | Alla Zhilyayeva (RUS) | 7 km | 22:14 | Galina Bogomolova (RUS) | 5 km | 16:18 | Oksana Belyakova Barak (RUS) | 6 km | 20:05 | Viktoriya Klimina (RUS) | 4.195 km | 13:47 | Elena Sipatova Chemyshova (RUS) |
