= 1990 World Junior Championships in Athletics – Women's 3000 metres =

The women's 3000 metres event at the 1990 World Junior Championships in Athletics was held in Plovdiv, Bulgaria, at Deveti Septemvri Stadium on 9 and 12 August.

== Medalists ==
Gold	Simona Staicu; Romania
Silver	Liu Shixiang; China
Bronze	Hatsumi Matsumoto; Japan

== Results ==
=== Final ===
12 August

Rank	Name	Nationality	Time	Notes
1st place, gold medalist(s)	Simona Staicu	Romania	9:09.57	
2nd place, silver medalist(s)	Liu Shixiang	China	9:10.54	
3rd place, bronze medalist(s)	Hatsumi Matsumoto	Japan	9:11.92	
4	Andrea Whitcombe	United Kingdom	9:13.81	
5	Andrea Sollárová	Czechoslovakia	9:16.44	
6	Azumi Miyazaki	Japan	9:16.76	
7	Lydia Tanui	Kenya	9:18.02	
8	Brynhild Synstnes	Norway	9:19.40	
9	Anikó Javos	Hungary	9:20.23	
10	Sarah Schwald	United States	9:25.67	
11	Angela White	Australia	9:27.66	
12	Tamara Salomon	Canada	9:28.30	
13	Kay Gooch	New Zealand	9:38.83	
14	Ann Mwangi	Kenya	9:42.15	
	Milka Mihailova	Bulgaria	DNF	

=== Heats ===
9 August

==== Heat 1 ====
Rank	Name	Nationality	Time	Notes
1	Lydia Tanui	Kenya	9:17.75	Q
2	Angela White	Australia	9:18.19	Q
3	Simona Staicu	Romania	9:18.69	Q
4	Liu Shixiang	China	9:18.77	Q
5	Andrea Whitcombe	United Kingdom	9:21.23	Q
6	Azumi Miyazaki	Japan	9:21.99	Q
7	Sarah Schwald	United States	9:22.57	q
8	Kay Gooch	New Zealand	9:23.10	q
9	Janeth Caizalitín	Ecuador	9:29.28	
10	Amina Maanaoui	Morocco	9:31.89	
11	Evelina Danaylova	Bulgaria	9:40.14	
	Marina Bastos	Portugal	DNF	

==== Heat 2 ====
Rank	Name	Nationality	Time	Notes
1	Ann Mwangi	Kenya	9:23.05	Q
2	Anikó Javos	Hungary	9:23.63	Q
3	Brynhild Synstnes	Norway	9:24.48	Q
4	Hatsumi Matsumoto	Japan	9:24.56	Q
5	Tamara Salomon	Canada	9:24.64	Q
6	Milka Mihailova	Bulgaria	9:24.87	Q
7	Andrea Sollárová	Czechoslovakia	9:25.76	q
8	Fatuma Roba	Ethiopia	9:26.63	
9	Annemari Sandell	Finland	9:28.46	
10	Annie Kagona	Malawi	9:45.25	
11	Zhor El-Kamch	Morocco	9:58.26	
12	Nicole Corbin	Australia	10:10.58	
13	Monica Samila	Tanzania	10:21.15	

== Participation ==
According to an unofficial count, 25 athletes from 20 countries participated in the event.

- Australia (2)
- Bulgaria (2)
- Canada (1)
- China (1)
- Czechoslovakia (1)
- Ecuador (1)
- Ethiopia (1)
- Finland (1)
- Hungary (1)
- Japan (2)
- Kenya (2)
- Malawi (1)
- Morocco (2)
- New Zealand (1)
- Norway (1)
- Portugal (1)
- Romania (1)
- Tanzania (1)
- United Kingdom (1)
- United States (1)
