= 1996 European Athletics Indoor Championships – Women's 3000 metres =

The women's 3000 metres event at the 1996 European Athletics Indoor Championships was held in Stockholm Globe Arena on 8–9 March.

== Medalists ==
Gold	Silver	Bronze
Fernanda Ribeiro; Portugal	Sara Wedlund; Sweden	Marta Domínguez; Spain

== Results ==
=== Heats ===
First 3 from each heat (Q) and the next 5 fastest (q) qualified for the final.

Rank	Heat	Name	Nationality	Time	Notes
1	2	Fernanda Ribeiro	Portugal	8:58.08	Q
2	2	Sara Wedlund	Sweden	8:59.00	Q
3	2	Lyudmila Petrova	Russia	8:59.15	Q
4	2	Laurence Duquénoy	France	8:59.15	q
5	2	Stela Olteanu	Romania	9:02.18	q
6	2	Elisa Rea	Italy	9:03.18	q
7	1	Luminita Gogîrlea	Romania	9:07.69	Q
8	1	Blandine Bitzner	France	9:08.03	Q
9	1	Roberta Brunet	Italy	9:08.06	Q
10	1	Mariya Pantyukhova	Russia	9:08.22	q
11	1	Marta Domínguez	Spain	9:08.35	q
12	1	Pilar Sisniega	Spain	9:11.93	
13	1	Teresa Duffy	Ireland	9:16.23	
14	2	María Abel	Spain	9:17.01	
15	1	Jeļena Čelnova	Latvia	9:17.23	
16	2	Anita Philpott	Ireland	9:18.20	

=== Final ===
Rank	Name	Nationality	Time	Notes
1st place, gold medalist(s)	Fernanda Ribeiro	Portugal	8:39.49	CR
2nd place, silver medalist(s)	Sara Wedlund	Sweden	8:50.32	NR
3rd place, bronze medalist(s)	Marta Domínguez	Spain	8:53.34	
4	Blandine Bitzner	France	8:54.86	
5	Mariya Pantyukhova	Russia	8:55.40	
6	Luminita Gogîrlea	Romania	8:56.29	
7	Roberta Brunet	Italy	8:57.66	
8	Elisa Rea	Italy	8:59.23	
9	Laurence Duquénoy	France	9:00.36	
10	Lyudmila Petrova	Russia	9:00.53	
11	Stela Olteanu	Romania	9:04.30	
