= 1990 IAAF World Cross Country Championships =

- Organisers: IAAF
- Edition: 18th
- Date: March 25
- Host city: Aix-les-Bains, Rhône-Alpes, France
- Venue: Hippodrome de Marlioz
- Events: 4
- Distances: 12.2 km – Senior men 8 km – Junior men 6 km – Senior women 4.4 km – Junior women
- Participation: 617 athletes from 59 nations

The 1990 IAAF World Cross Country Championships was held in Aix-les-Bains, France, at the Hippodrome de Marlioz on March 25, 1990. A report on the event was given in the Glasgow Herald.

Complete results for senior men, junior men, senior women, junior women, medallists, and the results of British athletes were published.

== Medallists ==
| Event | Gold | | Silver | | Bronze | |
|---|---|---|---|---|---|---|
Individual
| Senior men (12.2 km) | Khalid Skah; Morocco | 34:21 | Moses Tanui; Kenya | 34:21 | Julius M. Korir; Kenya | 34:22 |
| Junior men (8 km) | Kipyego Kororia; Kenya | 22:13 | Richard Chelimo; Kenya | 22:14 | Fita Bayissa; Ethiopia | 22:24 |
| Senior women (6 km) | Lynn Jennings; United States | 19:21 | Albertina Dias; Portugal | 19:33 | Yelena Romanova; Soviet Union | 19:33 |
| Junior women (4.4 km) | Liu Shixiang; China | 14:19 | Yan Qinglan; China | 14:20 | Susan Chepkemei; Kenya | 14:22 |
Team
| Senior men | Kenya | 42 | Ethiopia | 96 | Spain | 176 |
| Junior men | Kenya | 12 | Ethiopia | 27 | Italy | 85 |
| Senior women | Soviet Union | 37 | Ethiopia | 75 | Portugal | 80 |
| Junior women | Kenya | 20 | Japan | 44 | China | 68 |

== Race results ==
=== Senior men's race (12.2 km) ===
Individual race
| Rank | Athlete | Country | Time |
|---|---|---|---|
| 1st place, gold medalist(s) | Khalid Skah | Morocco | 34:21 |
| 2nd place, silver medalist(s) | Moses Tanui | Kenya | 34:21 |
| 3rd place, bronze medalist(s) | Julius M. Korir | Kenya | 34:22 |
| 4 | Haji Bulbula | Ethiopia | 34:25 |
| 5 | William Mutwol | Kenya | 34:26 |
| 6 | Ibrahim Kinuthia | Kenya | 34:30 |
| 7 | Domingos Castro | Portugal | 34:45 |
| 8 | Abebe Mekonnen | Ethiopia | 34:49 |
| 9 | Paul Kipkoech | Kenya | 34:50 |
| 10 | Antonio Prieto | Spain | 34:52 |
| 11 | Salvatore Antibo | Italy | 34:55 |
| 12 | Hammou Boutayeb | Morocco | 34:55 |
Full results

Teams
| Rank | Team | Points |
|---|---|---|
| 1st place, gold medalist(s) | Kenya: Moses Tanui / 2; Julius M. Korir / 3; William Mutwol / 5; Ibrahim Kinuthia / 6; Paul Kipkoech / 9; Boniface Merande / 17; (John Ngugi) / (20); (Joseph Kiptum) / (22); (Samuel Nyangincha) / (25) | 42 |
| 2nd place, silver medalist(s) | Ethiopia: Haji Bulbula / 4; Abebe Mekonnen / 8; Tesfaye Tafa / 14; Addis Abebe / 19; Jillo Dube / 24; Debebe Demisse / 27; (Chala Kelele) / (33); (Wami Alemayehu) / (74); (Melese Feissa) / (90) | 96 |
| 3rd place, bronze medalist(s) | Spain: Antonio Prieto / 10; Martín Fiz / 15; Alejandro Gómez / 32; José Manuel García / 36; Abel Antón / 38; Constantino Esparcia / 45; (Antonio Serrano) / (61); (Vicente Polo) / (69); (José Carlos Adán) / (153) | 176 |
| 4 | Portugal | 194 |
| 5 | Morocco | 268 |
| 6 | Italy | 289 |
| 7 | Soviet Union | 367 |
| 8 | United States | 441 |
Full results

- Note: Athletes in parentheses did not score for the team result

=== Junior men's race (8 km) ===
Individual race
| Rank | Athlete | Country | Time |
|---|---|---|---|
| 1st place, gold medalist(s) | Kipyego Kororia | Kenya | 22:13 |
| 2nd place, silver medalist(s) | Richard Chelimo | Kenya | 22:14 |
| 3rd place, bronze medalist(s) | Fita Bayissa | Ethiopia | 22:24 |
| 4 | Ismael Kirui | Kenya | 22:32 |
| 5 | Samuel Otieno | Kenya | 22:35 |
| 6 | Matthew Birir | Kenya | 22:47 |
| 7 | Abraham Assefa | Ethiopia | 22:58 |
| 8 | Assefa Gebremedhin | Ethiopia | 23:04 |
| 9 | Tesgie Legesse | Ethiopia | 23:07 |
| 10 | Dadi Tamrat | Ethiopia | 23:20 |
| 11 | Yahia Azaidj | Algeria | 23:26 |
| 12 | Salah Hissou | Morocco | 23:27 |
Full results

Teams
| Rank | Team | Points |
|---|---|---|
| 1st place, gold medalist(s) | Kenya: Kipyego Kororia / 1; Richard Chelimo / 2; Ismael Kirui / 4; Samuel Otieno / 5; (Matthew Birir) / (6); (Anthony Kiprono) / (125) | 12 |
| 2nd place, silver medalist(s) | Ethiopia: Fita Bayissa / 3; Abraham Assefa / 7; Assefa Gebremedhin / 8; Tesgie Legesse / 9; (Dadi Tamrat) / (10); (Lemi Erpassa) / (14) | 27 |
| 3rd place, bronze medalist(s) | Italy: Stefano Baldini / 13; Vincenzo Modica / 17; Francesco Bennici / 27; Christian Leuprecht / 28; (Oscar Gilotti) / (64); (Antonio Ciucio) / (75) | 85 |
| 4 | Japan | 96 |
| 5 | Spain | 117 |
| 6 | Algeria | 143 |
| 7 | Ireland | 154 |
| 8 | Canada | 158 |
Full results

- Note: Athletes in parentheses did not score for the team result

=== Senior women's race (6 km) ===
Individual race
| Rank | Athlete | Country | Time |
|---|---|---|---|
| 1st place, gold medalist(s) | Lynn Jennings | United States | 19:21 |
| 2nd place, silver medalist(s) | Albertina Dias | Portugal | 19:33 |
| 3rd place, bronze medalist(s) | Yelena Romanova | Soviet Union | 19:33 |
| 4 | Luchia Yeshak | Ethiopia | 19:33 |
| 5 | Nadia Dandolo | Italy | 19:39 |
| 6 | Jane Ngotho | Kenya | 19:41 |
| 7 | Conceição Ferreira | Portugal | 19:45 |
| 8 | Viorica Ghican | Romania | 19:47 |
| 9 | Margaret Wairimu | Kenya | 19:49 |
| 10 | Nadezhda Galyamova | Soviet Union | 19:50 |
| 11 | Olga Nazarkina | Soviet Union | 19:51 |
| 12 | Iulia Negura | Romania | 19:51 |
Full results

Teams
| Rank | Team | Points |
|---|---|---|
| 1st place, gold medalist(s) | Soviet Union: Yelena Romanova / 3; Nadezhda Galyamova / 10; Olga Nazarkina / 11; Regina Chistyakova / 13; (Natalya Sorokivskaya) / (28); (Tatyana Pozdnyakova) / (51) | 37 |
| 2nd place, silver medalist(s) | Ethiopia: Luchia Yeshak / 4; Derartu Tulu / 15; Adanech Erkulo / 25; Getenesh Urge / 31; (Tigist Moreda) / (66); (Addis Gezagne) / (78) | 75 |
| 3rd place, bronze medalist(s) | Portugal: Albertina Dias / 2; Conceição Ferreira / 7; Aurora Cunha / 21; Mónica Gama / 50; (Lucilia Soares) / (72); (Fernanda Marques) / (DNF) | 80 |
| 4 | Romania | 102 |
| 5 | United States | 112 |
| 6 | France | 125 |
| 7 | Australia | 126 |
| 8 | Japan | 172 |
Full results

- Note: Athletes in parentheses did not score for the team result

=== Junior women's race (4.4 km) ===
Individual race
| Rank | Athlete | Country | Time |
|---|---|---|---|
| 1st place, gold medalist(s) | Liu Shixiang | China | 14:19 |
| 2nd place, silver medalist(s) | Yan Qinglan | China | 14:20 |
| 3rd place, bronze medalist(s) | Susan Chepkemei | Kenya | 14:22 |
| 4 | Caroline Kwambai | Kenya | 14:23 |
| 5 | Lina Chesire | Kenya | 14:25 |
| 6 | Tamara Salomon | Canada | 14:27 |
| 7 | Malin Ewerlöf | Sweden | 14:30 |
| 8 | Ann Mwangi | Kenya | 14:30 |
| 9 | Minori Hayakari | Japan | 14:32 |
| 10 | Shiki Terasaki | Japan | 14:35 |
| 11 | Yumi Osaki | Japan | 14:35 |
| 12 | Melody Fairchild | United States | 14:37 |
Full results

Teams
| Rank | Team | Points |
|---|---|---|
| 1st place, gold medalist(s) | Kenya: Susan Chepkemei / 3; Caroline Kwambai / 4; Lina Chesire / 5; Ann Mwangi / 8; (Jane Ekimat) / (13); (Tegla Loroupe) / (16) | 20 |
| 2nd place, silver medalist(s) | Japan: Minori Hayakari / 9; Shiki Terasaki / 10; Yumi Osaki / 11; Natsue Koikawa / 14; (Makiko Okamoto) / (18); (Hozumi Otani) / (30) | 44 |
| 3rd place, bronze medalist(s) | China: Liu Shixiang / 1; Yan Qinglan / 2; Liu Xian / 27; Liu Yianying / 38; (Li Libin) / (46) | 68 |
| 4 | Ecuador | 86 |
| 5 | United Kingdom | 145 |
| 6 | Soviet Union | 147 |
| 7 | Canada | 148 |
| 8 | Morocco | 153 |
Full results

- Note: Athletes in parentheses did not score for the team result

== Medal table (unofficial) ==
| Rank | Nation | Gold | Silver | Bronze | Total |
|---|---|---|---|---|---|
| 1 | Kenya | 4 | 2 | 2 | 8 |
| 2 | China | 1 | 1 | 1 | 3 |
| 3 | Soviet Union | 1 | 0 | 1 | 2 |
| 4 | Morocco | 1 | 0 | 0 | 1 |
| 4 | United States | 1 | 0 | 0 | 1 |
| 6 | Ethiopia | 0 | 3 | 1 | 4 |
| 7 | Portugal | 0 | 1 | 1 | 2 |
| 8 | Japan | 0 | 1 | 0 | 1 |
| 9 | Italy | 0 | 0 | 1 | 1 |
| 9 | Spain | 0 | 0 | 1 | 1 |
| Totals (10 entries) | | 8 | 8 | 8 | 24 |

- Note: Totals include both individual and team medals, with medals in the team competition counting as one medal.

== Participation ==
An unofficial count yields the participation of 617 athletes from 59 countries, one athlete (senior men) less than the official number published.

- Albania (5)
- Algeria (16)
- Argentina (2)
- Australia (13)
- Belgium (26)
- Botswana (3)
- Brazil (16)
- Canada (27)
- China (5)
- Chinese Taipei (4)
- Colombia (1)
- Cyprus (5)
- Czechoslovakia (7)
- Denmark (4)
- East Germany (5)
- Ecuador (6)
- Ethiopia (21)
- Finland (9)
- France (27)
- Gibraltar (6)
- Hungary (5)
- Iceland (1)
- India (17)
- Iran (3)
- Ireland (26)
- Israel (2)
- Italy (27)
- Jamaica (4)
- Japan (24)
- Kenya (26)
- Lebanon (1)
- Mauritius (3)
- Mexico (16)
- Monaco (1)
- Morocco (16)
- Namibia (1)
- Netherlands (12)
- New Zealand (4)
- North Yemen (6)
- Norway (8)
- Paraguay (1)
- Poland (9)
- Portugal (27)
- Romania (11)
- Rwanda (2)
- San Marino (1)
- Soviet Union (23)
- Spain (27)
- Sweden (6)
- Switzerland (11)
- Tunisia (5)
- Turkey (7)
- United Kingdom (25)
- United States (27)
- U.S. Virgin Islands (2)
- West Germany (16)
- Yugoslavia (1)
- Zaire (1)
- Zambia (4)

== See also ==
- 1990 IAAF World Cross Country Championships – Senior men's race
- 1990 IAAF World Cross Country Championships – Junior men's race
- 1990 IAAF World Cross Country Championships – Senior women's race
- 1990 IAAF World Cross Country Championships – Junior women's race
- 1990 in athletics (track and field)
