= 1996 European Cross Country Championships =

International athletics competition

The 3rd European Cross Country Championships were held at Charleroi in Belgium on 15 December 1996. Jon Brown took the title in the men's competition and Sara Wedlund won the women's race.

== Results ==
=== Men individual 9.65 km ===
Pos.	Runners	Time
1st place, gold medalist(s)	(United Kingdom) Jon Brown	32:37
2nd place, silver medalist(s)	(Portugal) Paulo Guerra	33:12
3rd place, bronze medalist(s)	(France) Mustapha Essaïd	33:19
4.	(Denmark) Carsten Jørgensen	33:20
5.	(Portugal) Eduardo Henriques	33:28
6.	(Italy) Umberto Pusterla	33:36
7.	(Belgium) Vincent Rousseau	33:42
8.	(France) Yann Millon	33:42
9.	(Portugal) Vítor Almeida	33:43
10.	(Italy) Andrea Arlati	33:44
11.	(Portugal) José Regalo	33:54
12.	(Spain) Alejandro Gómez	?

100 runners finished.

=== Men teams ===
Pos.	Team	Points
1st place, gold medalist(s)	Portugal; Paulo Guerra; Eduardo Henriques; Vítor Almeida; José Regalo	27; 2; 5; 9; 11
2nd place, silver medalist(s)	France; Mustapha Essaïd; Yann Millon; Cédric Dehouck; Mohamed Ezzher	47; 3; 8; 17; 19
3rd place, bronze medalist(s)	Belgium; Vincent Rousseau; Marc Vanderstraeten; Koen Van Rie; Eric Bouffioux	59; 7; 14; 15; 23
4.	Italy; Umberto Pusterla; Andrea Arlati; Michele Gamba; Gabriele de Nard	62; 6; 10; 22; 24
5.	United Kingdom; Jonathan Brown; Andrew Pearson; Spencer Barden; Darrius Burrows	76; 1; 16; 27; 32
6.	Spain; Alejandro Gomez; Carlos Adan; Antonio Serrano; José Manuel Martinez	86; 12; 18; 21; 35
7.	Russia	124
8.	Ireland	138

Total 24 teams

=== Women individual 4.55 km ===
Pos.	Runners	Time
1st place, gold medalist(s)	(Sweden) Sara Wedlund	17:04
2nd place, silver medalist(s)	(Spain) Julia Vaquero	17:14
3rd place, bronze medalist(s)	(Finland) Annemari Sandell	17:19
4.	(Romania) Elene Fidatov	17:24
5.	(Portugal) Albertina Dias	17:29
6.	(Germany) Claudia Lokar	17:35
7.	(France) Yanna Oubouhou	17:36
8.	(United Kingdom) Hayley Haining	17:37
9.	(France) Laurence Vivier	17:39
10.	(Belgium) Anja Smolders	17:41
11.	(France) Chryssie Girard	17:42
12.	(France) Laurence Duquenoy	17:46

Iulia Negura from Romania finished first (16:58), but was disqualified because of doping violation. 73 runners finished.

=== Women teams ===
Pos.	Team	Points
1st place, gold medalist(s)	France; Yanna Oubouhou; Laurence Viver; Chryssie Girard	27; 7; 9; 11
2nd place, silver medalist(s)	United Kingdom; Hayley Haining; Andrea Whitcombe; Suzanne Rigg	39; 8; 14; 17
3rd place, bronze medalist(s)	Belgium; Anja Smolders; Veronique Collard; Lieve Slegers	43; 10; 15; 18
4.	Sweden; Sara Wedlund; Magdalena Thorsell; Maria Lundgren	45; 1; 16; 28
5.	Germany; Claudia Lokar; Petra Wassiluk; Sonja Krolik	64; 6; 23; 35
6.	Romania; Elena Fidatov; Nuta Olaru; Luminita Gogirlea	66; 4; 26; 36
7.	Ireland	71
8.	Spain	71

Total 19 teams
