= Athletics at the 1996 Summer Olympics – Women's 5000 metres =

Women's 5000 metres at the Games of the XXVI Olympiad
- Venue: Centennial Olympic Stadium
- Dates: 26 July 1996 (heats); 28 July 1996 (final)
- Competitors: 46 from 35 nations
- Winning time: 14:59.88

Medalists
1st place, gold medalist(s)		Wang Junxia; China
2nd place, silver medalist(s)		Pauline Konga; Kenya
3rd place, bronze medalist(s)		Roberta Brunet; Italy

These are the official results of the Women's 5000 metres at the 1996 Summer Olympics in Atlanta, Georgia, United States. There were a total of 48 competitors from 35 countries. The women's event was increased from 3000 meters in 1992 to 5000 meters in 1996 to match it with men's 5000 meters.

== Results ==
=== Heats ===
Qualification: First 4 in each heat (Q) and the next 3 fastest (q) qualified to the final.

Rank	Heat	Name	Nationality	Time	Notes
1	3	Pauline Konga	Kenya	15:07.01	Q, OR
2	1	Sonia O'Sullivan	Ireland	15:15.80	Q, OR
3	1	Elena Fidatov	Romania	15:17.89	Q
4	1	Lynn Jennings	United States	15:19.66	Q
5	1	Anita Weyermann	Switzerland	15:19.91	Q
6	1	Sara Wedlund	Sweden	15:20.61	q
7	3	Ayelech Worku	Ethiopia	15:21.59	Q
8	3	Amy Rudolph	United States	15:21.90	Q
9	1	Anne Hare	New Zealand	15:22.31	q
10	2	Roberta Brunet	Italy	15:22.58	Q
11	3	Yelena Romanova	Russia	15:23.37	Q
12	2	Michiko Shimizu	Japan	15:23.56	Q
13	2	Paula Radcliffe	Great Britain	15:23.90	Q
14	2	Wang Junxia	China	15:24.28	Q
15	2	Rose Cheruiyot	Kenya	15:26.87	q
16	2	Claudia Lokar	Germany	15:28.35	
17	3	Wei Li	China	15:33.49	
18	3	Silvia Sommaggio	Italy	15:33.63	
19	1	Petra Wassiluk	Germany	15:37.73	
20	1	Yang Siju	China	15:40.41	
21	1	Roseli Machado	Brazil	15:41.63	
22	3	Gabriela Szabo	Romania	15:42.35	
23	2	Kathy Butler	Canada	15:47.50	
24	2	Merima Denboba	Ethiopia	15:48.35	
25	3	Cristina Petite	Spain	15:48.63	
26	1	Lydia Cheromei	Kenya	15:49.85	
27	1	Harumi Hiroyama	Japan	15:50.43	
28	3	Zohra Ouaziz	Morocco	15:55.03	
29	3	Katy McCandless	Ireland	15:55.66	
30	2	Nina Christiansen	Denmark	15:56.38	
31	2	Ana Dias	Portugal	15:57.35	
32	3	Irina Mikitenko	Kazakhstan	15:57.67	
33	2	Stela Olteanu	Romania	15:58.28	
34	3	Yoshiko Ichikawa	Japan	15:58.90	
35	2	Jeļena Čelnova	Latvia	15:59.00	
36	2	Marie Davenport	Ireland	15:59.12	
37	1	Isabel Martínez	Spain	15:59.42	
38	3	Sonia McGeorge	Great Britain	16:01.92	
39	1	Luchia Yishak	Ethiopia	16:04.29	
40	2	Natalie Harvey	Australia	16:06.45	
41	1	Kate Anderson	Australia	16:17.83	
42	3	Robyn Meagher	Canada	16:24.49	
43	1	Alison Wyeth	Great Britain	16:24.74	
44	3	Marta Portoblanco	Nicaragua	18:42.78	
45	1	Rachida Mahamane	Niger	19:17.87	
	2	Gwen Griffiths	South Africa	DNS	
	3	Carolyn Schuwalow	Australia	DNS	

=== Final ===
Rank	Name	Nationality	Time	Notes
1st place, gold medalist(s)	Wang Junxia	China	14:59.88	OR
2nd place, silver medalist(s)	Pauline Konga	Kenya	15:03.49	
3rd place, bronze medalist(s)	Roberta Brunet	Italy	15:07.52	
4	Michiko Shimizu	Japan	15:09.05	
5	Paula Radcliffe	Great Britain	15:13.11	
6	Yelena Romanova	Russia	15:14.09	
7	Elena Fidatov	Romania	15:16.71	
8	Rose Cheruiyot	Kenya	15:17.33	
9	Lynn Jennings	United States	15:17.50	
10	Amy Rudolph	United States	15:19.77	
11	Sara Wedlund	Sweden	15:22.98	
12	Ayelech Worku	Ethiopia	15:28.81	
13	Anne Hare	New Zealand	15:29.11	
14	Anita Weyermann	Switzerland	15:44.40	
	Sonia O'Sullivan	Ireland	DNF	

== See also ==
- 1992 Women's Olympic 3,000 metres (Barcelona)
- 1993 Women's World Championships 3,000 metres (Stuttgart)
- 1994 Women's European Championships 3,000 metres (Helsinki)
- 1995 Women's World Championships 5,000 metres (Gothenburg)
- 1997 Women's World Championships 5,000 metres (Athens)
- 1998 Women's European Championships 5,000 metres (Budapest)
- 1999 Women's World Championships 5,000 metres (Seville)
- 2000 Women's Olympic 5,000 metres (Sydney)
