= Julius M. Korir =

Kenyan long-distance runner (born 1963)

Personal information
- Born: 5 December 1963 (age 62)

Sport
- Country: Kenya
- Sport: Athletics
- Event: Cross country running

Achievements and titles
- Personal bests: 5000 m: 13:22.07 (1991); 10,000 m: 27:34.96 (1991)
Medal record
Men's athletics
Representing Kenya
World Cross Country Championships
Gold medal – first place	1990 Aix-les-Bains	Team race
Bronze medal – third place	1990 Aix-les-Bains	Men's race
Grand Prix Final
Gold medal – first place	1991 Barcelona	5000 m

Julius M. Korir (born 5 December 1963), also listed as Julius Korir II and often just as Julius Korir, is a Kenyan former long-distance runner.

He was the individual bronze medalist at the 1990 World Cross Country Championships, helping Kenya to a gold medal in the team competition. Throughout his career, he was frequently confused with 1984 Olympic steeplechase champion and fellow Kenyan Julius Korir (born 1960). The steeplechaser Korir was injured before the 1988 Olympic trials and did not compete at major championships after 1984; Julius M. Korir continued his career into the 1990s.

== Career ==
A Kenyan runner named Julius Korir, described as the Olympic steeplechase champion, ran the 31 December 1987 BOclassic 10K run race.

Julius M. Korir competed in a 1989 10K run in Cannon Hill Park, part of an event to mark the centenary of Birmingham. Along with fellow Kenyans Kip Kimeli and Paul Kipkoech, he tried to set a fast pace so as to separate from Paul Davies-Hale. He finished 5th in 28:47 minutes.

The following March, Korir competed on the Kenyan senior race team at the 1990 World Cross Country Championships in Aix-les-Bains, France. The favorite John Ngugi faltered after 5 kilometres, giving way for his teammates Korir, Moses Tanui, William Mutwol, and Ibrahim Kinuthia to take the lead. Shortly after, Khalid Skah of Morocco and Ethiopia's Haji Bulbula ran from the field, and Skah would go on to win alongside Tanui. Korir finished within several yards of eventual race winner Khalid Skah, earning the bronze medal individually and a time one second slower than the winning mark. Kenya won the team gold medal with a score of 42 points, less than half that of runners-up Ethiopia with 96 points.

Korir ran two races in Japan later that year. On 6 May 1990, he was 4th in a 10,000 metres track race in Mito, running 28:43.11 minutes. One week later, he set a 5000 metres best of 14:23.98 in Hamamatsu, again finishing 4th.

Korir finished 10th at the 1991 Cross de San Sebastián race, part of the IAAF World Challenge Cross Country series. On 27 April 1991, Korir won an international road race in Switzerland. At the 1991 ISTAF Berlin meeting, Korir won the 10,000 metres with a time of 27:34.96 minutes. Three days later at the Memorial Van Damme, he set a 5000 metres best of 13:22.07 to finish runner-up. He matched that time at the 1991 IAAF Grand Prix Final later that month, running 13:22.14 to win the 5000 m.

Korir was ranked 4th in the world in road running through 1 September 1991, later adjusted to 9th on the year. He also competed in America and was ranked 5th in the 1991 Mobil Outdoor standings over 5000 m.

In 1992, Korir planned to compete in cross country races in Europe.

Korir won the Arnberg Invitational 5000 m in May 1994. Later that year, he ran 7:50.54 in a flat 3000 metres to finish 6th at a meeting in Bratislava.

== Personal life ==
Korir was born on 5 December 1963 or 12 May 1958. Korir was part of the Nandi people, a subgroup of the Kalenjin people, and was from the Rift Valley Province.

The Birmingham Mail reported in 1989 that Korir "had not yet been heard to say a word to anyone" in coverage of his race. He was vouched for by a spokesman who spoke to his running ability.
