= 1991 IAAF Grand Prix Final =

- Host city: Barcelona, Catalonia, Spain
- Events: 17
- Dates: 20 September
- Main venue: Estadi Olímpic Lluís Companys

The 1991 IAAF Grand Prix Final was the seventh edition of the season-ending competition for the IAAF Grand Prix track and field circuit, organised by the International Association of Athletics Federations. It was held on 20 September at the Estadi Olímpic Lluís Companys in Barcelona, Catalonia, Spain.

Sergey Bubka (pole vault) and Heike Henkel (high jump) were the overall points winners of the tournament. They were the first field athletes to win the series, all previous winners having come from track events. The programme featured 17 athletics events, ten for men and seven for women, marking a reduction by one from the last series.

The competition preceded the 1992 Barcelona Olympics, which hosted its athletics competition at the same location a year later.

== Medal summary ==
=== Men ===
Event	Gold		Silver		Bronze	
200 metres	Michael Johnson (USA)	19.88	Robson da Silva (BRA)	20.29	Frankie Fredericks (NAM)	20.47
400 metres	Roger Black (GBR)	44.97	Andrew Valmon (USA)	45.39	Raymond Pierre (USA)	45.67
1500 metres	Noureddine Morceli (ALG)	3:34.48	Saïd Aouita (MAR)	3:36.13	Jens-Peter Herold (GER)	3:36.37
5000 metres	Julius M. Korir (KEN)	13:22.14	Brahim Boutayeb (MAR)	13:22.99	Mathias Ntawulikura (RWA)	13:26.40
3000 metres steeplechase	Abdelaziz Sahere (MAR)	8:13.83	Moses Kiptanui (KEN)	8:13.92	Patrick Sang (KEN)	8:15.85
110 m hurdles	Tony Dees (USA)	13.37	Jack Pierce (USA)	13.44	Renaldo Nehemiah (USA)	13.64
Pole vault	Sergey Bubka (URS)	5.85 m	Scott Huffman (USA)	5.75 m	Kory Tarpenning (USA)	5.75 m
Long jump	Llewellyn Starks (USA)	8.19 m	Larry Myricks (USA)	8.06 m	Jaime Jefferson (CUB)	7.91 m
Discus throw	Lars Riedel (GER)	64.20 m	Wolfgang Schmidt (GER)	64.18 m	Romas Ubartas (URS)	63.96 m
Javelin throw	Jan Železný (TCH)	87.76 m	Vladimir Sasimovich (URS)	84.76 m	Kimmo Kinnunen (FIN)	82.98 m

=== Women ===
Event	Gold		Silver		Bronze	
100 metres	Merlene Ottey (JAM)	10.87	Gwen Torrence (USA)	11.08	Evelyn Ashford (USA)	11.18
800 metres	Ana Fidelia Quirot (CUB)	2:01.17	Hassiba Boulmerka (ALG)	2:01.25	Lyubov Gurina (URS)	2:01.89
One mile	Natalya Artyomova (URS)	4:17.00	Mary Slaney (USA)	4:28.35	Lyudmila Rogachova (URS)	4:33.51
3000 metres	Tatyana Dorovskikh (URS)	8:46.38	Margareta Keszeg (ROM)	8:46.76	Susan Sirma (KEN)	8:48.38
400 m hurdles	Sandra Farmer-Patrick (USA)	53.74	Janeene Vickers (USA)	54.07	Kim Batten (USA)	54.20
High jump	Heike Henkel (GER)	2.02 m	Stefka Kostadinova (BUL)	2.00 m	Angie Bradburn (USA)	1.89 m
Shot put	Huang Zhihong (CHN)	20.06 m	Natalya Lisovskaya (URS)	19.89 m	Astrid Kumbernuss (GER)	19.43 m

== Points leaders ==
=== Men ===
Event	Gold		Silver		Bronze	
Overall	Sergey Bubka (URS)	69	Jan Železný (TCH)	63	Michael Johnson (USA)	63
200 metres	Michael Johnson (USA)	54	Frankie Fredericks (NAM)	51	John Regis (GBR)	43
400 metres	Roger Black (GBR)	54	Andrew Valmon (USA)	48	Danny Everett (USA) Steve Lewis (USA) Raymond Pierre (USA)	39
1500 metres	Noureddine Morceli (ALG)	63	Saïd Aouita (MAR) Jens-Peter Herold (GDR)	42	Not awarded	
5000 metres	Brahim Boutayeb (MAR)	51	Richard Chelimo (KEN)	42	Ibrahim Kinuthia (KEN)	41
3000 metres steeplechase	Moses Kiptanui (KEN)	57	Patrick Sang (KEN)	47	Abdelaziz Sahere (MAR)	45
110 m hurdles	Tony Dees (USA)	61	Renaldo Nehemiah (USA)	57	Jack Pierce (USA)	48
Pole vault	Sergey Bubka (URS)	69	Kory Tarpenning (USA)	48	Scott Huffman (USA)	46
Long jump	Llewellyn Starks (USA)	59	Larry Myricks (USA)	53	Mike Powell (USA)	45
Discus throw	Romas Ubartas (URS)	55	Lars Riedel (GER)	45	Attila Horváth (HUN)	38
Javelin throw	Jan Železný (TCH)	63	Kimmo Kinnunen (FIN)	43	Vladimir Sasimovich (URS)	38

=== Women ===
Event	Gold		Silver		Bronze	
Overall	Heike Henkel (GER)	63	Merlene Ottey (JAM)	63	Natalya Artyomova (URS)	63
100 metres	Merlene Ottey (JAM)	63	Gwen Torrence (USA)	57	Mary Onyali (NGR)	45
800 metres	Ana Fidelia Quirot (CUB)	59	Lyubov Gurina (URS)	47	Charmaine Crooks (CAN)	42
One mile	Natalya Artyomova (URS)	63	Doina Melinte (ROM)	44	Hassiba Boulmerka (ALG)	37
3000 metres	Susan Sirma (KEN)	48	Margareta Keszeg (ROM)	47	PattiSue Plumer (USA)	45
400 m hurdles	Sandra Farmer-Patrick (USA)	63	Sally Gunnell (GBR)	51	Margarita Ponomaryova (URS)	50
High jump	Heike Henkel (GER)	63	Stefka Kostadinova (BUL)	51	Inga Babakova (URS)	40
Shot put	Huang Zhihong (CHN)	61	Natalya Lisovskaya (URS)	57	Astrid Kumbernuss (GER)	49
