= Fantaye =

Fantaye or Fentaye is a feminine name of Ethiopian origin. It may refer to:

- Fantaye Belayneh (born 2000), Ethiopian long-distance runner
- Fantaye Sirak (born 1963), Ethiopian middle-distance runner
