= 1990 IAAF World Cross Country Championships – Junior men's race =

Junior men's race at the 1990 IAAF World Cross Country Championships
- Organisers: IAAF
- Edition: 18th
- Date: March 25
- Host city: Aix-les-Bains, Rhône-Alpes, France
- Venue: Hippodrome de Marlioz
- Events: 1
- Distances: 8 km – Junior men
- Participation: 127 athletes from 30 nations

The Junior men's race at the 1990 IAAF World Cross Country Championships was held in Aix-les-Bains, France, at the Hippodrome de Marlioz on March 25, 1990. A report on the event was given in the Glasgow Herald.

Complete results, medallists, and the results of British athletes were published.

== Race results ==
=== Junior men's race (8 km) ===
==== Individual ====
Rank	Athlete	Country	Time
1st place, gold medalist(s)	Kipyego Kororia	Kenya	22:13
2nd place, silver medalist(s)	Richard Chelimo	Kenya	22:14
3rd place, bronze medalist(s)	Fita Bayissa	Ethiopia	22:24
4	Ismael Kirui	Kenya	22:32
5	Samuel Otieno	Kenya	22:35
6	Matthew Birir	Kenya	22:47
7	Abraham Assefa	Ethiopia	22:58
8	Assefa Gebremedhin	Ethiopia	23:04
9	Tesgie Legesse	Ethiopia	23:07
10	Dadi Tamrat	Ethiopia	23:20
11	Yahia Azaidj	Algeria	23:26
12	Salah Hissou	Morocco	23:27
13	Stefano Baldini	Italy	23:30
14	Lemi Erpassa	Ethiopia	23:35
15	Seiji Kushibe	Japan	23:38
16	Ion Avramescu	Romania	23:39
17	Vincenzo Modica	Italy	23:39
18	Francisco Munuera	Spain	23:40
19	Mark Carroll	Ireland	23:42
20	Mark Johansen	United States	23:43
21	Javier Cortés	Spain	23:43
22	Ryuji Takei	Japan	23:44
23	Javier Caballero	Spain	23:54
24	Claes Nyberg	Sweden	23:55
25	Robinson Semolini	Brazil	23:56
26	Abdelkrim Benzai	Algeria	23:57
27	Francesco Bennici	Italy	23:57
28	Christian Leuprecht	Italy	23:59
29	Hiroyuki Nakamura	Japan	24:02
30	Osamu Nara	Japan	24:02
31	Brahim Sassi	Tunisia	24:05
32	Joël Bourgeois	Canada	24:08
33	Kevin Sullivan	Canada	24:08
34	Niall Bruton	Ireland	24:13
35	Steve Green	United Kingdom	24:16
36	Jon Gascoyne	United Kingdom	24:17
37	John Coyle	United States	24:18
38	Hirofumi Katafuchi	Japan	24:19
39	Stephane Picard	France	24:20
40	Rodolfo Lopes	Portugal	24:20
41	Mark Burdis	Ireland	24:21
42	Andrew Pearson	United Kingdom	24:21
43	Stanislav Yordanov	Soviet Union	24:23
44	Janik Lambert	Canada	24:26
45	Nasradine Cherifi	France	24:27
46	Abich Benkhelifa	Tunisia	24:28
47	Malcolm Campbell	United Kingdom	24:28
48	Kazuhiro Kawauchi	Japan	24:29
49	Jason Bunston	Canada	24:32
50	Kamel Kohil	Algeria	24:33
51	Philippe Jacquemin	Belgium	24:33
52	Vladimir Golyas	Soviet Union	24:33
53	Dhahbi Anizi	Tunisia	24:36
54	Kent Claesson	Sweden	24:39
55	José Luis Francisco	Spain	24:40
56	Ryad Gatte	Algeria	24:41
57	Rainer Huth	West Germany	24:41
58	Hartmut Merl	West Germany	24:42
59	Alexandr Litvinov	Soviet Union	24:43
60	Bryan Conway	Ireland	24:44
61	Tom van Hooste	Belgium	24:45
62	Jaroslaw Cichocki	Poland	24:45
63	Marc Dauer	West Germany	24:45
64	Oscar Gilotti	Italy	24:45
65	Chadli Mastouri	France	24:47
66	Paul Logan	Ireland	24:47
67	Roman Korzh	Soviet Union	24:48
68	Awad Saleh Ahmed	North Yemen	24:53
69	Colin de Burca	Ireland	24:56
70	Fabrice Chomaud	France	24:56
71	Stathis Stasi	Cyprus	24:56
72	Krzysztof Baldyga	Poland	24:57
73	David Bretel	France	24:57
74	Jeff Campbell	United States	24:58
75	Antonio Ciucio	Italy	24:58
76	Paul Stoneham	United States	25:00
77	Anatoly Yefremov	Soviet Union	25:01
78	Sami Alanen	Finland	25:03
79	Stelios Marneros	Cyprus	25:03
80	Apolinar Caudillo	Mexico	25:04
81	Abdelhak Lebouazda	Algeria	25:09
82	Graham Hood	Canada	25:09
83	Germano Neves	Portugal	25:12
84	Delfim Conceição	Portugal	25:17
85	Ridha Ghuizani	Tunisia	25:18
86	Jacky Lovis	Switzerland	25:19
87	Elisardo de la Torre	Spain	25:20
88	Alvaro Ramalhete	Portugal	25:25
89	Anwar Al-Harazi	North Yemen	25:25
90	Mokhtar Belaid	Algeria	25:26
91	Jaroslaw Sitarz	Poland	25:26
92	Goim Hussein	North Yemen	25:28
93	Jason Mohr	United States	25:29
94	Donald van Boven	Belgium	25:29
95	Luis Suárez	Spain	25:30
96	Georgios Loucaides	Cyprus	25:30
97	Nicos Marcou	Cyprus	25:31
98	Holger Ahrenberg	West Germany	25:31
99	Bhairav Singh	India	25:31
100	Shawn McKay	Canada	25:35
101	Rachid Benmohamed	Belgium	25:37
102	Jan Everyman	Belgium	25:40
103	Marcio Pazin	Brazil	25:43
104	Jamey Harris	United States	25:44
105	Frank Schouren	West Germany	25:47
106	Mounir Dellali	Tunisia	26:01
107	Nimrod Branka	Israel	26:07
108	Ali Harezi Al-Ghazali	North Yemen	26:07
109	Abdelghawi Fisal	North Yemen	26:15
110	Mario Figueiredo	Portugal	26:21
111	Patrick Grammens	Belgium	26:26
112	Kevin Toher	United Kingdom	26:29
113	Remzi Atli	Turkey	26:31
114	Ahmed Al-Saqaf	North Yemen	26:32
115	Mikaël Thomas	France	26:39
116	K.M. Chinnappa	India	27:07
117	Grzegorz Krystek	Poland	27:20
118	Paul Ignacio	Gibraltar	27:21
119	Tyrone Cano	Gibraltar	27:39
120	Wiktor Malina	Poland	28:03
121	Darren McComb	Gibraltar	28:11
122	Richard Muscat	Gibraltar	28:13
123	Stavros Panagiotou	Cyprus	28:44
124	Gareth Cano	Gibraltar	29:14
125	Anthony Kiprono	Kenya	33:52
126	Damien Muscat	Gibraltar	33:52
—	Julio Figueiredo	Portugal	DNF

==== Teams ====
Rank	Team	Points
1st place, gold medalist(s)	Kenya: Kipyego Kororia / 1; Richard Chelimo / 2; Ismael Kirui / 4; Samuel Otieno / 5; (Matthew Birir) / (6); (Anthony Kiprono) / (125)	12
2nd place, silver medalist(s)	Ethiopia: Fita Bayissa / 3; Abraham Assefa / 7; Assefa Gebremedhin / 8; Tesgie Legesse / 9; (Dadi Tamrat) / (10); (Lemi Erpassa) / (14)	27
3rd place, bronze medalist(s)	Italy: Stefano Baldini / 13; Vincenzo Modica / 17; Francesco Bennici / 27; Christian Leuprecht / 28; (Oscar Gilotti) / (64); (Antonio Ciucio) / (75)	85
4	Japan: Seiji Kushibe / 15; Ryuji Takei / 22; Hiroyuki Nakamura / 29; Osamu Nara / 30; (Hirofumi Katafuchi) / (38); (Kazuhiro Kawauchi) / (48)	96
5	Spain: Francisco Munuera / 18; Javier Cortés / 21; Javier Caballero / 23; José Luis Francisco / 55; (Elisardo de la Torre) / (87); (Luis Suárez) / (95)	117
6	Algeria: Yahia Azaidj / 11; Abdelkrim Benzai / 26; Kamel Kohil / 50; Ryad Gatte / 56; (Abdelhak Lebouazda) / (81); (Mokhtar Belaid) / (90)	143
7	Ireland: Mark Carroll / 19; Niall Bruton / 34; Mark Burdis / 41; Bryan Conway / 60; (Paul Logan) / (66); (Colin de Burca) / (69)	154
8	Canada: Joël Bourgeois / 32; Kevin Sullivan / 33; Janik Lambert / 44; Jason Bunston / 49; (Graham Hood) / (82); (Shawn McKay) / (100)	158
9	United Kingdom: Steve Green / 35; Jon Gascoyne / 36; Andrew Pearson / 42; Malcolm Campbell / 47; (Kevin Toher) / (112)	160
10	United States: Mark Johansen / 20; John Coyle / 37; Jeff Campbell / 74; Paul Stoneham / 76; (Jason Mohr) / (93); (James Harris) / (104)	207
11	Tunisia: Brahim Sassi / 31; Abich Benkhelifa / 46; Dhahbi Anizi / 53; Ridha Ghuizani / 85; (Mounir Dellali) / (106)	215
12	France: Stephane Picard / 39; Nasradine Cherifi / 45; Chadli Mastouri / 65; Fabrice Chomaud / 70; (David Bretel) / (73); (Mikaël Thomas) / (115)	219
13	Soviet Union: Stanislav Yordanov / 43; Vladimir Golyas / 52; Alexandr Litvinov / 59; Roman Korzh / 67; (Anatoly Yefremov) / (77)	221
14	West Germany: Rainer Huth / 57; Hartmut Merl / 58; Marc Dauer / 63; Holger Ahrenberg / 98; (Frank Schouren) / (105)	276
15	Portugal: Rodolfo Lopes / 40; Germano Neves / 83; Delfim Conceição / 84; Alvaro Ramalhete / 88; (Mario Figueiredo) / (110); (Julio Figueiredo) / (DNF)	295
16	Belgium: Philippe Jacquemin / 51; Tom van Hooste / 61; Donald van Boven / 94; Rachid Benmohamed / 101; (Jan Everyman) / (102); (Patrick Grammens) / (111)	307
17	Poland: Jaroslaw Cichocki / 62; Krzysztof Baldyga / 72; Jaroslaw Sitarz / 91; Grzegorz Krystek / 117; (Wiktor Malina) / (120)	342
18	Cyprus: Stathis Stasi / 71; Stelios Marneros / 79; Georgios Loucaides / 96; Nicos Marcou / 97; (Stavros Panagiotou) / (123)	343
19	North Yemen: Awad Saleh Ahmed / 68; Anwar Al-Harazi / 89; Goim Hussein / 92; Ali Harezi Al-Ghazali / 108; (Abdelghawi Fisal) / (109); (Ahmed Al-Saqaf) / (114)	357
20	Gibraltar: Paul Ignacio / 118; Tyrone Cano / 119; Darren McComb / 121; Richard Muscat / 122; (Gareth Cano) / (124); (Damien Muscat) / (126)	480

- Note: Athletes in parentheses did not score for the team result

== Participation ==
An unofficial count yields the participation of 127 athletes from 30 countries in the Junior men's race. This is in agreement with the official numbers as published.

- Algeria (6)
- Belgium (6)
- Brazil (2)
- Canada (6)
- Cyprus (5)
- Ethiopia (6)
- Finland (1)
- France (6)
- Gibraltar (6)
- India (2)
- Ireland (6)
- Israel (1)
- Italy (6)
- Japan (6)
- Kenya (6)
- Mexico (1)
- Morocco (1)
- North Yemen (6)
- Poland (5)
- Portugal (6)
- Romania (1)
- Soviet Union (5)
- Spain (6)
- Sweden (2)
- Switzerland (1)
- Tunisia (5)
- Turkey (1)
- United Kingdom (5)
- United States (6)
- West Germany (5)

== See also ==
- 1990 IAAF World Cross Country Championships – Senior men's race
- 1990 IAAF World Cross Country Championships – Senior women's race
- 1990 IAAF World Cross Country Championships – Junior women's race
