= Isabel Martínez =

Isabel Martínez may refer to:

- Isabel Perón (Isabel Martínez de Perón), Argentine politician
- Isabel Martínez (actress), Mexican actress and comedian
- Isabel Martínez (athlete), Spanish long-distance runner
