= 1988 World Junior Championships in Athletics – Women's 3000 metres =

The women's 3000 metres event at the 1988 World Junior Championships in Athletics was held in Sudbury, Ontario, Canada, at Laurentian University Stadium on 28 and 30 July.

== Medalists ==
Gold	Ann Mwangi; Kenya
Silver	Fernanda Ribeiro; Portugal
Bronze	Yvonne Lichtenfeld; East Germany

== Results ==
=== Final ===
30 July

Rank	Name	Nationality	Time	Notes
1st place, gold medalist(s)	Ann Mwangi	Kenya	9:13.99	
2nd place, silver medalist(s)	Fernanda Ribeiro	Portugal	9:15.33	
3rd place, bronze medalist(s)	Yvonne Lichtenfeld	East Germany	9:16.02	
4	Rosario Pia	Portugal	9:16.62	
5	Simona Staicu	Romania	9:17.96	
6	Liu Shixiang	China	9:20.88	
7	Malin Ewerlöf	Sweden	9:23.37	
8	Fatima Maama	Morocco	9:24.19	
9	Caroline Jeorgakopoulos	West Germany	9:28.72	
10	Helen Titterington	United Kingdom	9:31.23	
11	Nadia Ouaziz	Morocco	9:44.04	
12	Angelines Rodríguez	Spain	9:44.32	
13	Annalisa Scurti	Italy	9:47.08	
14	Tonya Todd	Canada	9:49.64	
15	Mwahija Maliga	Tanzania	10:20.01	

=== Heats ===
28 July

==== Heat 1 ====
Rank	Name	Nationality	Time	Notes
1	Ann Mwangi	Kenya	9:20.60	Q
2	Malin Ewerlöf	Sweden	9:21.85	Q
3	Fatima Maama	Morocco	9:22.15	Q
4	Angelines Rodríguez	Spain	9:22.86	Q
5	Rosario Pia	Portugal	9:23.03	Q
6	Yvonne Lichtenfeld	East Germany	9:24.05	Q
7	Annalisa Scurti	Italy	9:27.17	q
8	Mwahija Maliga	Tanzania	9:31.09	q
9	Tonya Todd	Canada	9:38.73	q
10	Alina Karwowski	Brazil	9:42.88	
11	Denise Bushallow	United States	9:59.53	
12	Belinda McArdle	Ireland	10:09.85	
13	Fanny Gidiyoni	Malawi	10:38.17	

==== Heat 2 ====
Rank	Name	Nationality	Time	Notes
1	Liu Shixiang	China	9:20.41	Q
2	Caroline Jeorgakopoulos	West Germany	9:22.40	Q
3	Nadia Ouaziz	Morocco	9:23.54	Q
4	Helen Titterington	United Kingdom	9:25.70	Q
5	Fernanda Ribeiro	Portugal	9:26.80	Q
6	Simona Staicu	Romania	9:27.12	Q
7	Kari Uglem	Norway	9:41.09	
8	Getenesh Urge	Ethiopia	9:48.20	
9	Paola Testa	Italy	9:48.74	
10	Sonia O'Sullivan	Ireland	9:50.31	
11	Tausi Saidi	Tanzania	9:52.35	
12	Andrea Pernitsky	Canada	9:59.00	

== Participation ==
According to an unofficial count, 25 athletes from 19 countries participated in the event.

- Brazil (1)
- Canada (2)
- China (1)
- East Germany (1)
- Ethiopia (1)
- Ireland (2)
- Italy (2)
- Kenya (1)
- Malawi (1)
- Morocco (2)
- Norway (1)
- Portugal (2)
- Romania (1)
- Spain (1)
- Sweden (1)
- Tanzania (2)
- United Kingdom (1)
- United States (1)
- West Germany (1)
