= Murder of Surjit Athwal =

Honour killing of a British Indian woman in India

Surjit Kaur Athwal
- Surjit Athwal
- Born: 17 July 1971; Coventry, England
- Died: December 1998 (aged 27); Punjab, India
- Occupation: Customs agent at London Heathrow Airport
- Known for: Being the victim of an honour killing in India
- Spouse: Sukhdev Singh Athwal

Surjit Kaur Athwal (17 July 1971 – December 1998) was a British-Indian woman murdered in an honour killing in India. She was 27 years old at the time of her death, and had two children, aged 7 and 9 months.

Her murder was instigated by her mother-in-law, 70-year-old Bachan Kaur Athwal, in collusion with Surjit's husband, Sukhdev Singh Athwal. Surjit had started divorce proceedings against her abusive husband. A divorce would bring shame onto the Athwals, so Bachan Kaur lured Surjit to India, leading her to believe that if she attended two weddings in Punjab, the family would consent to a divorce. Instead, she was killed there and her body has never been found.

This case marked the first conviction, in a British court, of an honour killing committed outside of the UK.

== Background ==
Surjit was born in Coventry, England, in 1971 and grew up in the Foleshill suburb of the city.

In 1988, at age 16, she married Sukhdev Singh Athwal in a forced marriage. He was ten years older than Surjit and they'd met only once before they were married and she moved in with his family. Both Sukhdev and Surjit's family are Sikhs, of Punjabi origin.

Bachan Kaur Athwal was the matriarch of the family, described as "controlling" by her daughter-in-law and was said to treat Surjit like a slave. Keen for some independence, Surjit found work as a customs agent with HM Customs and Excise at London Heathrow Airport; she began to dress in western-style clothing, wore make-up and socialised with her colleagues. Both Bachan Kaur and Sukhdev beat and abused her to try and get her to conform to their standards and Sukhdev started spying on her while she was out with her workmates, eventually spotting her with another man. She had formed a relationship with someone she had met at work and was having an affair. When this was discovered, she sought a divorce.

At the time of her disappearance, Surjit and Sukhdev resided in Hayes, London Borough of Hillingdon; they lived next door to Sukhdev's mother, his brother Hardev Athwal and sister-in-law Sarbjit Athwal and had two children.

== Murder ==
In December 1998, a meeting was held at the home of Bachan Kaur Athwal; in attendance were her daughter, Bhajan Kaur Bhinder, her two sons and her daughter-in-law, Sarbjit. It is claimed that Bachan Kaur told the other attendees that she intended to "get rid of" Surjit and would be taking her to India, where plans had already been made to achieve this aim.

Meanwhile, after initially refusing to agree to a divorce, Bachan Kaur told Surjit that a divorce could go ahead if she accompanied her to two weddings in India; the pair flew to Delhi on 4 December 1998. They were met at the airport by Bachan Kaur's brother, Darshan Singh, and on 5 and 6 December attended two weddings in rural Punjab. After the weddings Surjit went to a travel agent to try to secure an earlier flight home but was unable to do so, and she did not return on 18 December as originally scheduled.

When Surjit failed to return and questions were asked about her whereabouts, Bachan Kaur and Sukhdev wove a web of deceit to cover up her disappearance; they claimed that she had run away with another man in India and Sukhdev claimed to have spoken to her on the phone to confirm that she wasn't coming back, yet he told someone else she'd "passed away"; they forged letters purporting to be from the Metropolitan Police which they sent to the Indian Police to put them off investigating, and they forged conveyancing documents so they could transfer Surjit's financial share of the family home to themselves. It also transpired that Sukhdev had taken out a life insurance policy on Surjit the day she flew to India; he then petitioned for a divorce, claiming desertion.

In reality, Bachan and Sukhdev had conspired to have Surjit murdered in India. She was taken by two men – one of whom was, allegedly, the brother of Bachan Kaur – and was drugged and strangled. Her body was thrown in the Ravi River and has never been recovered.

== Investigation ==
The day after Surjit flew to Delhi her sister-in-law, Sarbjit Athwal, claims to have contacted Crimestoppers UK, leaving an answerphone message about her concerns for Surjit's safety but didn't receive a response. When Surjit failed to return to the UK on 18 December, she sent an anonymous letter to the local police station repeating her concerns.

In May 2000, Bachan Kaur, Sukhdev Athwal and two other family members were arrested on suspicion of conspiracy to murder but were released without charge. The evidence was deemed purely circumstantial.

Sarbjit described the years following Surjit's disappearance as living "in a constant climate of fear"; she was effectively coerced and threatened into silence. It wasn't until 2004, when she was taken into hospital with a life-threatening, stress-related condition, that she decided to try and free herself from the Athwal family. When she left hospital she went back to her parents' home, where she told her father everything that had happened and he eventually managed to persuade her to go back to the police and make a statement. Sarbjit and her family were subjected to death threats, intimidation and were shunned within the local Sikh community as a result.

In 2005, after Sarbjit had given a police statement, British authorities re-opened the murder case.

Sarbjit's statement referenced the family meeting at which the plot to "get rid of" Surjit was discussed and it also alleged that Bachan Kaur had explicitly told her that Surjit had been killed in India and thrown in the river.

On 3 November 2005, one of Bachan Kaur's daughters' was arrested and quizzed about the family meeting of December 1998; she denied being at the meeting, but she did acknowledge that her mother had told her that Surjit had been killed. She later backtracked and claimed not to remember anything about such a conversation, but was compelled to testify as a hostile witness at the trial.

Metropolitan Police officers, led by DCI Clive Driscoll, travelled to India to gather evidence and interview suspects and, after a complex investigation, Bachan Kaur and Sukhdev Athwal were charged with conspiracy to murder in November 2005 and with murder in August 2006.

=== Legal proceedings ===
Bachan Kaur Athwal and Sukhdev Athwal stood trial at the Old Bailey in spring 2007; the trial, led by Michael Worsley QC and DI Gill Barratt lasted for three months. Sarbjit spent three-and-a-half days giving evidence and being cross-examined; she was the first person to testify against her own family members in an open court, in a British honour killing trial.

Both Bachan Kaur Athwal and Sukhdev Athwal were found guilty of murder; Bachan Kaur was given a life sentence with a minimum term of 20 years; Karen McVeigh of The Guardian stated that Bachan was "one of the oldest women in criminal history to be jailed for life"; she was aged 70 at the time of sentencing. Sukhdev received a life sentence with a minimum term of 27 years.

In March 2009, Bachan Kaur appealed against both her conviction and sentence. Her appeal against conviction was dismissed, but her minimum tariff was reduced to 15 years. It was deemed that the original sentence was "manifestly excessive" due to her advanced age and the "grave cultural difficulties (Bachan) will encounter" in jail.

Sukhdev appealed against his sentence but not his conviction; the minimum tariff was duly reduced to 20 years.

=== Aftermath ===
Surjit's children were taken into the care of Social Services when their father was arrested.

In January 2008, a confiscation order was issued to recoup proceeds obtained by Bachan Kaur and Sukhdev Athwal when they fraudulently transferred ownership of Surjit's previous home to themselves. Sukhdev had forged Surjit's signature on the documentation in 2004 and the house was sold in 2007, the money was deposited into Bachan Kaur's account and then quickly transferred out into the bank accounts of various family members. After being forced to return what would've been Surjit's portion of the proceeds, it was awarded to her two children via a compensation order.

Surjit's brother, Jagdeesh, who campaigned relentlessly for action after his sister's disappearance, continued to pursue his quest to have those directly responsible for Surjit's murder prosecuted; in 2013, he wrote to British Prime Minister, David Cameron, asking that he "press the Indian Prime Minister" to have the Central Bureau of Investigation (CBI) of India reinvestigate the case. In response, the Foreign and Commonwealth Office stated: "We cannot interfere in another country's legal procedures, just as they cannot interfere in ours". Surjit's killers remain free.

== In media ==
Donal MacIntyre, a journalist covering the criminal sphere, made a documentary about the case. (CBS Reality: Murder Files. Series 1, Episode 7)

Really (TV channel) crime series, "The Killer in My Family" (Series 1, Episode 5 - Bachan Kaur Athwal) also covered the case.

In September 2022, Surjit's story was featured on the podcast Method & Madness.

In June 2023, Surjit's story was revisited in series 2 of 'When Missing Turns to Murder'.
