= Liu Shixiang =

Chinese long-distance runner

Medal record

Women's athletics

Representing China

Asian Championships
Gold medal – first place	1998 Fukuoka	10,000 m
Silver medal – second place	1998 Fukuoka	5000 m

Liu Shixiang (born 13 January 1971 in Wulian County, Shandong province) is a retired Chinese long-distance runner who specialized in the 5000 metres.

Her personal best time was 14:32.33 minutes, achieved in October 1997 in Shanghai. She also had 8:55.89 minutes in the 3000 metres and 30:55.83 minutes in the 10,000 metres.

She was absent from a mandatory drug test in 2001 and received a two-year ban.

== International competitions ==
Year	Competition	Venue	Position	Event	Notes
Representing China
1988	World Junior Championships	Sudbury, Canada	—	1500m	DNF
1988	World Junior Championships	Sudbury, Canada	6th	3000m	9:20.88
1990	World Junior Championships	Plovdiv, Bulgaria	2nd	3000 m	9:10.54
1990	World Cross Country Championships	Aix-les-Bains, France	1st	Junior race (4.4 km)	14:19
1998	Asian Championships	Fukuoka, Japan	2nd	5000 m	15:53.76
1998	Asian Championships	Fukuoka, Japan	1st	10,000 m	32:28.49
1998	World Cup	Johannesburg, South Africa	6th	5000 m	16:51.74
