= Alessandra Corti =

Italian middle-distance runner

Personal information
- National team: Italy (3 caps 1986)
- Born: 28 December 1961 (age 64) Seregno, Italy

Sport
- Country: Italy
- Sport: Athletics
- Events: Middle-distance running; Cross country running

Achievements and titles
- Personal best: 1500: 4:17.98 (1986)

Alessandra Corti (born 28 December 1961) is a former Italian female middle-distance runner and cross-country runner who competed at individual senior level at the World Athletics Cross Country Championships (1986).
