= Antonio Prieto (runner) =

Spanish long-distance runner

Personal information
- Born: 11 January 1958 (age 68) Hontoria, Segovia, Spain

Sport
- Sport: Track and field
Medal record
Representing Spain
Mediterranean Games
Bronze medal – third place	1983 Casablanca	5000m

António Prieto Velasco (born 11 January 1958) is a retired long-distance runner from Spain, who represented his native country three times in the men's 10,000 metres at the Summer Olympics, starting in 1980 (Moscow, Soviet Union).

== Achievements ==
Year	Competition	Venue	Position	Event	Notes
Representing Spain
1979	Universiade	Mexico City, Mexico	5th	5000 m	14:39.1
1983	World Championships	Helsinki, Finland	11th	10,000 m	28:11.57
1983	Ibero-American Championships	Barcelona, Spain	1st	10,000 m	28:58.19
1984	Olympic Games	Los Angeles, United States	24th (h)	10,000 m	28:57.78
1988	Olympic Games	Seoul, South Korea	10th	10,000 m	27:52.78
1989	World Cup	Barcelona, Spain	3rd	10,000 m	28:07.42
1990	World Cross Country Championships	Aix-les-Bains, France	10th	Long race (12.2 km)	34:52
1990	World Cross Country Championships	Aix-les-Bains, France	3rd	Team	176 pts
1990	European Championships	Split, Yugoslavia	4th	10,000 m	28:05.35
1991	World Championships	Tokyo, Japan	23rd (h)	10,000 m	28:57.28
