= Nina Belikova =

Russian long-distance runner

Medal record

Women's athletics

Representing Russia

European Cross Country Championships
| Bronze medal – third place | 1995 Alnwick | Senior race |

Nina Belikova (Russian: Нина Беликова; born 19 December 1961) is a Russian former long-distance runner. She was the bronze medallist at the 1995 European Cross Country Championships and led a Russian team including Alla Zhilyaeva and Yelena Baranova to the women's team title.

She was also a member of the Russian team for the IAAF World Cross Country Championships in 1994 and 1995. She helped the Russian women to fourth at the former edition, finishing 22nd, but fell down to 71st on her second appearance.

== International competitions ==
| Year | Competition | Venue | Position | Event | Notes |
|---|---|---|---|---|---|
| 1994 | World Cross Country Championships | Budapest, Hungary | 22nd | Senior race | 21:28 |
| 1994 | World Cross Country Championships | Budapest, Hungary | 4th | Senior team | 84 pts |
| 1995 | World Cross Country Championships | Durham, United Kingdom | 71st | Senior race | 21:58 |
| 1995 | European Cross Country Championships | Alnwick, United Kingdom | 3rd | Senior race | 14:09 |
| 1995 | European Cross Country Championships | Alnwick, United Kingdom | 1st | Senior team | 20 pts |
