= Andrew Pearson (runner) =

British long-distance runner

Medal record

Men's athletics

Representing the United Kingdom

European Cross Country Championships
Bronze medal – third place	1995 Alnwick	Senior race
Bronze medal – third place	1995 Alnwick	Senior team

Andrew Pearson (born 14 September 1971) is a British long-distance runner who mainly had success in cross country running. He made eight appearances at the IAAF World Cross Country Championships and was an individual and team bronze medallist at the 1995 European Cross Country Championships (his highest honour). He also won silver medals at the European Mountain Running Championships in 1998.

== Career ==
A Yorkshire-based athlete with Longwood Harriers Athletic Club, Pearson won the intermediate category of the 1988 English Schools' Cross Country. International appearances followed in the junior section of the 1989 and 1990 IAAF World Cross Country Championships, where he placed 62nd then 42nd, respectively. He became his country's top junior cross country runner, with a win at the national trials in 1990 and wins at the English Cross Country Championships in 1991 and 1992.

Pearson made his senior international debut at the 1993 IAAF World Cross Country Championships and with his 32nd-place finish he led the British team to seventh in the rankings (two places ahead of fellow Briton Eamonn Martin, who won the London Marathon that year. He placed in the top 15 at the 1993 Great North Run and this led to his selection for the 1994 World Half Marathon Championships. He only managed 60th place there, being the last scoring runner in the British men's team that ranked 12th overall. Pearson reached his mid-twenties before establishing himself at the peak of the sport domestically. He was runner-up in the senior race at the 1995 English Cross Country Championships, then became Britain's top-ranked cross country runner in 1996, although he was runner-up to Keith Cullen at the national trials that year.

The 1995 season proved to be Pearson's most successful internationally. At the 1995 IAAF World Cross Country Championships he reached twentieth place – 35 places ahead of the next British runner Keith Cullen. His sole international cross country medals came at the 1995 European Cross Country Championships. He took the bronze medal and led a team of Cullen, Jon Brown and David Taylor to the men's team bronze medals.

Pearson had some success on different surfaces in the years following this, including a AAA Championships title in the 10-mile run in 1997 and individual and team silver medals at the 1998 European Mountain Running Trophy, finishing behind Antonio Molinari.

He made five straight British teams for the IAAF World Cross Country Championships from 1995 to 1999. Though he never won the national trials event, he was runner-up two further times in 1998 and 1999. After 1995, he fell behind in the national team, with Brown and Cullen typically leading the British men's team. Pearson placed around the middle of the field at the World Cross Country, finishing in the top 60 athletes in 1996, 1997 and 1998, before falling back to 65th in his last outing at the competition.

After his last international appearance in 1999, he focused mainly on road running as he progressed into his thirties. He won the Nottingham Half Marathon in 2001 and was the 2010 winner of the Sheffield Half Marathon. He had back-to-back wins at the Leeds Half Marathon in 2009 and 2010.

== International competitions ==
Year	Competition	Venue	Position	Event	Notes
1989	World Cross Country Championships	Stavanger, Norway	62nd	Junior race	27:54
1990	World Cross Country Championships	Aix-les-Bains, France	42nd	Junior race	24:21
1990	World Cross Country Championships	Aix-les-Bains, France	9th	Junior team	160 pts
1993	World Cross Country Championships	Amorebieta, Spain	32nd	Senior race	34:18
1993	World Cross Country Championships	Amorebieta, Spain	7th	Senior team	353 pts
1994	World Half Marathon Championships	Oslo, Norway	60th	Half marathon	1:04:30
1994	World Half Marathon Championships	Oslo, Norway	12th	Team	3:10:51
1995	World Cross Country Championships	Durham, United Kingdom	20th	Senior race	35:07
1995	World Cross Country Championships	Durham, United Kingdom	9th	Senior team	354 pts
1995	European Cross Country Championships	Alnwick, United Kingdom	3rd	Senior race	26:47
1995	European Cross Country Championships	Alnwick, United Kingdom	3rd	Senior team	55 pts
1996	World Cross Country Championships	Stellenbosch, South Africa	51st	Senior race	36:07
1996	World Cross Country Championships	Stellenbosch, South Africa	5th	Senior team	252 pts
1997	World Cross Country Championships	Turin, Italy	56th	Senior race	37:18
1997	World Cross Country Championships	Turin, Italy	6th	Senior team	325 pts
1998	World Cross Country Championships	Marrakesh, Morocco	59th	Senior race	36:41
1998	World Cross Country Championships	Marrakesh, Morocco	10th	Senior team	216 pts
1998	European Mountain Running Trophy	Sestiere, Italy	2nd	Senior race	53:44
1998	European Mountain Running Trophy	Sestiere, Italy	2nd	Senior team	24 pts
1999	World Cross Country Championships	Belfast, United Kingdom	65th	Senior race	42:48
1999	World Cross Country Championships	Belfast, United Kingdom	8th	Senior team	159 pts
