= Rachida Mahamane =

Nigerien long-distance runner (born 1981)

Personal information
- Nationality: Nigerien
- Born: 25 August 1981 (age 44)

Sport
- Sport: Long-distance running
- Event: 5000 metres

Rachida Mahamane (born 25 August 1981) is a Nigerien long-distance runner. She competed in the Women's 5000 metres at the 1996 Summer Olympics. She was the first woman to represent Niger at the Olympics.
