= María Santana =

Cuban softball player

Personal information
- Nationality: Cuban
- Born: 9 December 1963 (age 61)

Sport
- Sport: Softball

María Santana (born 9 December 1963) is a Cuban softball player. She competed in the women's tournament at the 2000 Summer Olympics.
