= Adriano Pezzoli =

Italian long-distance runner

Personal information
- Nationality: Italian
- Born: 21 May 1964 (age 62)

Sport
- Country: Italy
- Sport: Athletics
- Event(s): Long-distance running Marathon

Achievements and titles
- Personal best: Marathon: 2:21:19 (1991)

Adriano Pezzoli (born 21 May 1964) is a former Italian male long-distance runner who competed at two editions of the IAAF World Cross Country Championships at senior level (1990, 1991).
