= Yukiko Okamoto (runner) =

Japanese long-distance runner

Yukiko Okamoto, also known as Sachiko Okamoto, (Japanese: 岡本幸子; born 29 November 1974) is a retired Japanese runner who specialized in the half marathon and marathon.

At the 1990 World Cross Country Championships she finished eighteenth in the junior race, and won a silver medal in the team competition. At the 1995 World Cross Country Championships she finished fifteenth in the senior race and ended fourth in the team competition. She also won a bronze medal at the 1996 World Road Relay Championships.

She later finished ninth at the 1998 World Half Marathon Championships and eighth at the 2000 World Half Marathon Championships. These two championships ended with a fifth place and silver medal, respectively, in team competition.

Okamoto became Japanese champion once, in the 10,000 metres in 2000.

Her personal best times were 15:27.77 minutes in the 5000 metres, achieved in June 1996 in Nishinomiya; 32:06.42 minutes in the 10,000 metres, achieved in October 2000 in Sendai; 1:09:12 hours in the half marathon, achieved in March 2000 in Yamaguchi; and 2:26:21 hours in the marathon, achieved in March 2001 in Nagoya.
