= Calvin Dallas =

United States Virgin Islands athlete

Personal information
- Nationality: American Virgin Islander
- Born: April 2, 1952 (age 73)
- Height: 1.78 m (5 ft 10 in)
- Weight: 68 kg (150 lb)

Sport
- Sport: Long-distance running
- Event: Marathon

Calvin Dallas (born April 2, 1952) is a long-distance runner who represents the United States Virgin Islands. He competed in the men's marathon at the 1988 Summer Olympics and the 1992 Summer Olympics.
