= Fantaye Sirak =

Ethiopian middle-distance runner

Personal information
- Nationality: Ethiopian
- Born: 17 December 1963 (age 62)

Sport
- Sport: Middle-distance running
- Event: 800 metres

Fantaye Sirak (born 17 December 1963) is an Ethiopian middle-distance runner. She competed in the women's 800 metres at the 1980 Summer Olympics. She was the first woman to represent Ethiopia at the Olympics.
