= Katy McCandless =

Irish long-distance runner (born 1970)

Personal information
- Full name: Katharine McCandless
- Nationality: Irish
- Born: 22 June 1970 (age 56)

Sport
- Sport: Long-distance running
- Event: 5000 metres

Katharine McCandless (born 22 June 1970) is an Irish long-distance runner. She competed in the women's 5000 metres at the 1996 Summer Olympics.

McCandless competed for the Princeton Tigers track and field team in the NCAA.
