= Simona Viola =

Italian long-distance runner

Personal information
- Nationality: Italian
- Born: 18 November 1971 (age 54)

Sport
- Country: Italy
- Sport: Athletics
- Event(s): Middle-distance running Long-distance running Marathon
- Club: Fiat Sud Formia

Achievements and titles
- Personal bests: 5000 metres: 16:15.93 (1994); Half Marathon: 1:12:59 (2003); Marathon: 2:33:33 (1999)

Simona Viola (born 18 November 1971) is an Italian retired female long-distance runner and marathon runner, who competed at the 2003 World Championships in Athletics.

== Achievements ==
Year	Competition	Venue	Position	Event	Time	Notes
1994	Italian Marathon	(Italy) Carpi	1st	Marathon	2:36:07	
2003	World Championships	(France) Paris	58th	Marathon	2:54:27	
