= Stavros Panagiotou =

Greek footballer

Personal information
- Date of birth: 1 July 1993 (age 33)
- Place of birth: Arta, Greece
- Height: 1.71 m (5 ft 7 in)
- Position: Left-back

Team information
- Current team: Anagennisi Arta

Youth career
- Ethnikos Filippiada

Senior career*
Years	Team	Apps	(Gls)
2012–2013	Kassiopi	9	(0)
2013–2015	Karaiskakis		
2015–2016	Olympiacos Volos	2	(0)
2016–2017	Sparta	5	(0)
2017	Panegialios	4	(0)
2017–2018	Sparta	32	(0)
2018–2020	Karaiskakis	41	(1)
2020–2023	Levadiakos	50	(2)
2023–2024	Chania	7	(1)
2025	Niki Volos	3	(0)
2025–2026	Kavala	18	(0)
2026–	Anagennisi Arta	0	(0)
- * Club domestic league appearances and goals as of 20 April 2026

Stavros Panagiotou (Greek: Σταύρος Παναγιώτου; born 1 July 1993) is a Greek professional footballer who plays as a left-back for Gamma Ethniki club Anagennisi Arta.

== Honours ==
Levadiakos

- Super League 2: 2021–22
