= Tesfaye Tafa =

Ethiopian long-distance runner

Medal record

Men's athletics

Representing Ethiopia

African Championships
Gold medal – first place	1990 Cairo	Marathon

Tesfaye Tafa (born 15 November 1962) is a retired Ethiopian runner. In addition to being the African marathon champion in 1990, he is noted for winning the Amsterdam Marathon as well as being the first African to ever win the Mexico City Marathon, setting a new course record (that has since been broken).

== International competitions ==
Year	Competition	Venue	Position	Event	Notes
Representing Ethiopia
1989	World Cross Country Championships	Stavanger, Norway	5th	Long race	
1989	World Cross Country Championships	Stavanger, Norway	3rd	Team	
1989	Mexico City Marathon	Mexico City, Mexico	1st	Marathon	2:17:54
1990	World Cross Country Championships	Aix-les-Bains, France	14th	Long race	
1990	World Cross Country Championships	Aix-les-Bains, France	2nd	Team	
1990	Boston Marathon	Boston, United States	11th	Marathon	2:14:29
1990	African Championships	Cairo, Egypt	1st	Marathon	2:33:38
1991	Boston Marathon	Boston, United States	7th	Marathon	2:14:07
1991	Amsterdam Marathon	Amsterdam, Netherlands	1st	Marathon	2:13:26
1992	Boston Marathon	Boston, United States	10th	Marathon	2:13:36
1993	World Cup Marathon Marathon	San Sebastián, Spain	14th	Marathon	2:11:57
