= Angela White (athlete) =

Australian long-distance runner (born 1974)

Angela White (22 March 1974) is an Australian athlete. She participated in the 1995 IAAF World Cross Country Championships and also the 1990 World Junior Championships in Athletics.
