= Sara Wedlund =

Swedish long-distance runner (1975–2021)

Personal information
- Born: 27 December 1975 Vällingby, Sweden
- Died: 11 June 2021 (aged 45)

Sport
- Sport: Women's athletics
Medal record
Women's athletics
Representing Sweden
European Athletics Indoor Championships
| Silver medal – second place | 1996 Stockholm | Individual |
European Cross Country Championships
| Silver medal – second place | 1995 Alnwick | Individual |
| Gold medal – first place | 1996 Charleroi | Individual |

Sara Christina Wedlund (27 December 1975 – 11 June 2021) was a Swedish long-distance and cross country runner, scoring successes in the mid 1990s as one of the most successful Swedish female runners at the time.

She finished ninth at the 1995 World Championships (5000 m), won the silver medals at the 1995 European Cross Country Championships and the 1996 European Indoor Championships (3000 m), finished 11th at the 1996 Summer Olympics and won the gold medal at the 1996 European Cross Country Championships. She was awarded the Victoria Award in 1996. She represented the club Hässelby SK.

She died on 11 June 2021, at the age of 45.
