= Bob Kempainen =

American long-distance runner

Personal information
- Born: June 18, 1966 (age 60) Minneapolis, Minnesota, United States

Sport
- Sport: Marathon running

Robert Kempainen (born June 18, 1966) is an American retired two-time Olympian long-distance runner. He participated in the 1992 (Barcelona, Spain) and in 1996 (Atlanta, United States) Olympics.

He made his marathon debut in 1991 at the Twin Cities Marathon in Minnesota, where he finished 2nd in 2:12:12. In 1992, he qualified for the Olympic Games by running a 2:12:54 for third place in the Olympic Trials marathon, held in Columbus, Ohio. He finished 2nd at the 1993 New York City Marathon in a time of 2:11:03. His best time for the marathon was 2:08:47 at the 1994 Boston Marathon, where he finished 7th. In 1995, he finished 2nd at the Los Angeles Marathon, in a time of 2:11:59. He was the 1996 Olympic Trials Marathon (held in Charlotte, North Carolina) champion, winning in a time of 2:12:45.

In other USA distance running championships, Kempainen was also the 1990 US National Cross Country Champion.

A graduate of Dartmouth College and University of Minnesota Medical School, Dr. Kempainen currently holds a position at Hennepin County Medical Center where he practices as a pulmonologist and critical care physician, he is also the current course director of the Pulmonary block for first year medical students at the University of Minnesota.

== Achievements ==
- All results regarding marathon, unless stated otherwise

Year	Competition	Venue	Position	Notes
Representing the United States
1992	Olympic Games	Barcelona, Spain	17th	2:15:53
1996	Olympic Games	Atlanta, United States	31st	2:18:38
