= Teresa Duffy =

Irish long-distance runner

Personal information
- Born: 16 July 1969 (age 56)

Sport
- Country: Ireland
- Sport: Long-distance running

Teresa Duffy (born 16 July 1969) is an Irish long-distance runner. In 2001, she competed in the women's marathon at the 2001 World Championships in Athletics held in Edmonton, Alberta, Canada. She finished in 39th place.
