= Dube Jillo =

Ethiopian long-distance runner

Dube Jillo (born September 12, 1970) is a retired long-distance runner from Ethiopia, who won the 1996 edition of the Vienna Marathon. A year later he triumphed at the Rome City Marathon, clocking a total time of 2:13:08.

== Achievements ==
Year	Competition	Venue	Position	Event	Notes
Representing Ethiopia
1996	Vienna City Marathon	Vienna, Austria	1st	Marathon	2:12:51
1997	Rome City Marathon	Rome, Italy	1st	Marathon	2:13:08
1999	World Championships	Seville, Spain	31st	Marathon	2:23:04
