= Isabel Martínez (athlete) =

Spanish long-distance runner

Personal information
- Nationality: Spanish
- Born: 28 December 1972 (age 53)

Sport
- Sport: Long-distance running
- Event: 5000 metres

Marisa Isabel Martínez (born 28 December 1972) is a Spanish long-distance runner. She competed in the women's 5000 metres at the 1996 Summer Olympics.
