= José Manuel García (runner) =

Spanish long-distance runner (born 1966)

José Manuel García González (born 24 January 1966 in León) is a retired Spanish long-distance runner. He specialized in the marathon and cross-country running.

== Achievements ==
Year	Competition	Venue	Position	Notes
Representing Spain
1985	European Junior Championships	Cottbus, East Germany	3rd	5000 m
1990	World Cross Country Championships	Aix-les-Bains, France	3rd	Team competition
1991	World Cross Country Championships	Antwerp, Belgium	3rd	Team competition
1995	World Cross Country Championships	Durham, England	13th	Long race
1995	World Cross Country Championships	Durham, England	3rd	Team competition
1996	World Half Marathon Championships	Palma de Mallorca, Spain	2nd	Team competition
1997	World Championships	Athens, Greece	15th	Marathon

=== Personal bests ===
- 5000 metres - 14:04.29 min (1995)
- ½ marathon - 1:03:59 hrs (2002)
- Marathon - 2:08:40 hrs (1998)
