= Stela Olteanu =

Romanian long-distance runner

Personal information
- Nationality: Romanian
- Born: 25 February 1972 (age 54)

Sport
- Sport: Long-distance running
- Event: 5000 metres

Stela Olteanu (née Apetre; born 25 February 1972) is a Romanian long-distance runner. She competed in the women's 5000 metres at the 1996 Summer Olympics.
