= Simona Staicu =

Hungarian long-distance runner

Personal information
- Full name: Simona Staicu
- Nickname: Simcsi
- Nationality: HUN/ROM
- Born: 5 May 1971 (age 55) Băileşti, Romania
- Height: 1.63 m (5 ft 4 in)
- Weight: 48 kg (106 lb)

Sport
- Sport: Athletics
- Events: Long-distance running, marathon
- Club: DVSC
- Coached by: herself

Achievements and titles
- Personal bests: 5000 m: 15:36.69; 100000 m: 32:36.88; Marathon: 2:29:59, halfmarathon: 1:10:11

Simona Staicu (born 5 May 1971 in Băileşti, Romania) is a Romanian-born Hungarian long-distance and marathon runner. Transferring her allegiance from Romania in 2000 to compete internationally for Hungary, Staicu has won numerous titles in the half-marathon, and has attained a personal best of 2:29:59 at the Milano City Marathon in Milan, Italy. Staicu trains under the tutelage of her husband, coach, and former runner András Juhász, as a member of the track and field team, at Budapesti Vasutas Sport Club in Budapest.

Staicu qualified for the Hungarian team, as a 33-year-old, in the women's marathon at the 2004 Summer Olympics in Athens. She registered an IAAF A-standard and a 2004 seasonal best of 2:36:46, following her victory at the Osaka Marathon in Japan. Staicu finished the race with a forty-fifth place time in 2:48:57 from a vast field of 83 marathon runners, just twelve seconds slower than her entry standard.
