= Ibrahim Kinuthia =

Kenyan long-distance runner

Ibrahim Kinuthia (born 22 May 1963) is a retired Kenyan long-distance runner who specialized in the 5000 and 10,000 metres.

He won a bronze medal in 5000 metres at the 1991 All-Africa Games, and finished third in the IAAF Grand Prix circuit the same year. That year he ran the 5000 m in 13:09.76 minutes, which was the second best time in the world that season, only behind Yobes Ondieki.
