= Alla Zhilyayeva =

Russian long-distance runner

Alla Nikolayevna Zhilyaeva (Russian: Алла Николаевна Жиляева; born 5 February 1969) is a female long-distance runner from Russia. She set a Russian national record for the women's 10,000 metres at the 2003 World Championships in Athletics, with a time of 30:23.07.

== International competitions ==
Representing Russia
Year	Competition	Venue	Position	Event	Notes
1995	World Championships	Gothenburg, Sweden	7th	10,000 m	
1996	Olympic Games	Atlanta, United States	—	Marathon	DNF
1997	Boston Marathon	Boston, United States	7th	Marathon	2:31:55
2003	World Cross Country Championships	Lausanne, Switzerland	8th	Short race	
2003	World Championships	Saint-Denis, France	5th	10,000 m	30:23.07
2003	World Athletics Final	Monaco	8th	5000 m	
2003	World Half Marathon Championships	Vilamoura, Portugal	6th	Half marathon	
2005	World Championships	Helsinki, Finland	13th	10,000 m	

== Professional road races ==
Year	Competition	Venue	Position	Event	Notes
1995	Reims Marathon	Reims, France	1st	Marathon	2:27:38
1997	Marseille-Cassis Classique Internationale	Marseille, France	1st	Half Marathon	1:10:34
1999	Monaco Marathon	Monte Carlo, Monaco	1st	Marathon	2:34:37
1999	Reims Marathon	Reims, France	1st	Marathon	2:31:27

== Personal bests ==
Distance	Mark	Date	Location
Mile run	4:34.73	6 June 2004	Tula, Russia
3000 metres	8:47.46	5 June 2004	Tula, Russia
5000 metres	14:59.46	25 July 2004	Tula, Russia
10,000 metres	30:23.07	23 August 2003	Saint-Denis, France
Half marathon	1:09:43	27 June 1998	Moscow
Marathon	2:30:00	23 May 1999	San Diego
