= 1998 European Marathon Cup =

1998 Marathon competition held in Budapest, Hungary

The 1998 European Marathon Cup was the sixth edition of the European Marathon Cup of athletics and were held in Budapest, Hungary, inside of the 1998 European Championships.

== Results ==
Team men
#	Nations	Time
1	Italy	8:51:04
2	Spain	8:55:31
3	Portugal	8:59:52

Team women
#	Nations	Time
1	Russia	9:58:43
2	Italy	10:10:14
3	Germany	10:15:23

Individual men
Rank	Athlete	Time	Note
1st place, gold medalist(s)	Stefano Baldini (ITA)	2:12:01	
2nd place, silver medalist(s)	Danilo Goffi (ITA)	2:12:11	
3rd place, bronze medalist(s)	Vincenzo Modica (ITA)	2:12:53	
4	Julio Rey (ESP)	2:13:17	
5	Alejandro Gómez (ESP)	2:13:23	
6	Antoni Peña (ESP)	2:13:53	
7	Giovanni Ruggiero (ITA)	2:13:59	
8	Richard Nerurkar (GBR)	2:14:02	
9	João Lopes (POR)	2:14:19	
10	António Salvador (POR)	2:14:28	

Individual women
Rank	Athlete	Time	Note
1st place, gold medalist(s)	Manuela Machado (POR)	2:27:10	CR
2nd place, silver medalist(s)	Madina Biktagirova (RUS)	2:28:01	
3rd place, bronze medalist(s)	Maura Viceconte (ITA)	2:28:31	
4	Franca Fiacconi (ITA)	2:28:59	
5	Marleen Renders (BEL)	2:29:43	
6	Rocio Rios (ESP)	2:29:53	
7	Lyubov Morgunova (RUS)	2:30:07	
8	Yelena Razdrogina (RUS)	2:30:09	
9	Lyudmila Petrova (RUS)	2:30:26	
10	Claudia Dreher (GER)	2:31:10	

== See also ==
- 1998 European Athletics Championships – Men's Marathon
- 1998 European Athletics Championships – Women's Marathon
