= 1999 World Championships in Athletics – Men's marathon =

The official results of the Men's Marathon at the 1999 World Championships in Seville, Spain, held on Saturday August 28, 1999.

== Medalists ==
Gold	Abel Antón; Spain (ESP)
Silver	Vincenzo Modica; Italy (ITA)
Bronze	Nobuyuki Sato; Japan (JPN)

== Abbreviations ==
- All times shown are in hours:minutes:seconds

DNS	did not start
NM	no mark
WR	world record
AR	area record
NR	national record
PB	personal best
SB	season best

== Records ==
Standing records prior to the 1999 World Athletics Championships
World Record	Ronaldo da Costa (BRA)	2:06:05	September 20, 1998	Berlin, Germany
Event Record	Robert de Castella (AUS)	2:10:03	August 14, 1983	Helsinki, Finland
Season Best	Gert Thys (RSA)	2:06:33	February 14, 1999	Tokyo, Japan

== Intermediates ==
Rank	Number	Athlete	Time
5 KILOMETRES
1	965	Mostafa El Damaoui (MAR)	17:03
2	1372	Luke Magongo (SWZ)	17:06
3	960	Abdelfattah Aïtzouri (MAR)	17:12
4	848	Nobuyuki Sato (JPN)	17:13
5	1178	António Salvador (POR)	17:13
10 KILOMETRES
1	965	Mostafa El Damaoui (MAR)	32:30
2	859	Simon Biwott (KEN)	33:06
3	848	Nobuyuki Sato (JPN)	33:06
4	362	Francisco Javier Cortés (ESP)	33:12
5	793	Vincenzo Modica (ITA)	33:12
15 KILOMETRES
1	965	Mostafa El Damaoui (MAR)	48:01
2	793	Vincenzo Modica (ITA)	48:41
3	782	Danilo Goffi (ITA)	48:41
4	770	Daniele Caimmi (ITA)	48:41
5	960	Abdelfattah Aïtzouri (MAR)	48:41
20 KILOMETRES
1	965	Mostafa El Damaoui (MAR)	1:03:55
2	793	Vincenzo Modica (ITA)	1:04:55
3	859	Simon Biwott (KEN)	1:04:55
4	770	Daniele Caimmi (ITA)	1:04:56
5	960	Abdelfattah Aïtzouri (MAR)	1:04:56
HALF MARATHON
1	965	Mostafa El Damaoui (MAR)	1:07:24
2	1228	Gert Thys (RSA)	1:08:13
3	859	Simon Biwott (KEN)	1:08:17
4	848	Nobuyuki Sato (JPN)	1:08:17
5	1206	Makhosonke Fika (RSA)	1:08:18
25 KILOMETRES
1	965	Mostafa El Damaoui (MAR)	1:19:49
2	859	Simon Biwott (KEN)	1:20:16
3	793	Vincenzo Modica (ITA)	1:20:16
4	848	Nobuyuki Sato (JPN)	1:20:17
5	770	Daniele Caimmi (ITA)	1:20:17
30 KILOMETRES
1	848	Nobuyuki Sato (JPN)	1:35:30
2	793	Vincenzo Modica (ITA)	1:35:48
3	859	Simon Biwott (KEN)	1:35:48
4	1206	Makhosonke Fika (RSA)	1:35:49
5	782	Danilo Goffi (ITA)	1:35:49
35 KILOMETRES
1	848	Nobuyuki Sato (JPN)	1:51:10
2	793	Vincenzo Modica (ITA)	1:51:34
3	354	Abel Antón (ESP)	1:51:34
4	859	Simon Biwott (KEN)	1:51:34
5	1228	Gert Thys (RSA)	1:51:35
40 KILOMETRES
1	354	Abel Antón (ESP)	2:06:55
2	848	Nobuyuki Sato (JPN)	2:07:09
3	793	Vincenzo Modica (ITA)	2:07:11
4	1174	Luis Novo (POR)	2:07:27
5	782	Danilo Goffi (ITA)	2:07:39

== Final ranking ==
Rank	Athlete	Time	Note
1st place, gold medalist(s)	Abel Antón (ESP)	2:13:36	
2nd place, silver medalist(s)	Vincenzo Modica (ITA)	2:14:03	
3rd place, bronze medalist(s)	Nobuyuki Sato (JPN)	2:14:07	
4	Luis Novo (POR)	2:14:27	SB
5	Danilo Goffi (ITA)	2:14:50	
6	Atsushi Fujita (JPN)	2:15:45	
7	Koji Shimizu (JPN)	2:15:50	
8	Martín Fiz (ESP)	2:16:17	
9	Simon Biwott (KEN)	2:16:20	
10	Daniele Caimmi (ITA)	2:16:23	
11	Gezahegne Abera (ETH)	2:16:42	
12	Gemechu Kebede (ETH)	2:16:44	
13	Ambesse Tolosa (ETH)	2:16:45	
14	Mostafa El Damaoui (MAR)	2:16:49	
15	Gert Thys (RSA)	2:17:13	
16	Simon Mphulanyane (RSA)	2:17:38	
17	Makhosonke Fika (RSA)	2:17:47	
18	Akira Manai (JPN)	2:17:56	
19	Jean Pierre Monciaux (FRA)	2:18:07	
20	Roberto Barbi (ITA)	2:18:13	
21	Hyung Jae-Young (KOR)	2:18:19	
22	Nikolaos Pollias (GRE)	2:18:27	
23	Mohamed Ouaadi (FRA)	2:18:45	
24	Rod DeHaven (USA)	2:19:06	SB
25	Giovanni Ruggiero (ITA)	2:19:34	
26	Eddy Hellebuyck (USA)	2:20:18	
27	Bruce Deacon (CAN)	2:20:25	
28	Alfred Shemweta (SWE)	2:20:27	
29	Steve Moneghetti (AUS)	2:20:32	
30	Belaye Wolashe (ETH)	2:21:04	
31	Dube Jillo (ETH)	2:23:04	
32	Anders Szalkai (SWE)	2:23:18	
33	Azzedine Sakhri (ALG)	2:23:39	
34	Jonathan Hume (USA)	2:23:50	
35	Valeriu Vlas (MDA)	2:24:22	
36	Tadayuki Ojima (JPN)	2:24:29	
37	John Monyatso (RSA)	2:25:03	
38	Juan Camacho (MEX)	2:25:18	
39	António Zeferino (CPV)	2:26:03	
40	Alejandro Gómez (ESP)	2:26:40	
41	Faustino Reynoso (MEX)	2:26:57	
42	Alejandro Cruz (MEX)	2:27:31	
43	Rachid Aitbensalem (MAR)	2:27:51	
44	Mohamed Guennani (FRA)	2:28:59	
45	Vicente Chura (PER)	2:29:27	
46	Abner Chipu (RSA)	2:29:51	
47	Steve Swift (USA)	2:30:04	
48	Patrick Carroll (AUS)	2:31:26	
49	Willy Kalombo Mwenze (COD)	2:31:55	
50	Francisco Javier Cortés (ESP)	2:32:06	
51	Sergey Zabavski (TJK)	2:32:22	
52	Andreiy Gordeyev (BLR)	2:33:09	
53	Mpakeletsa Sephali (LES)	2:33:21	
54	William Ramirez (COL)	2:36:18	
55	Zvade Vodage (ISR)	2:36:19	
56	Luke Magongo (SWZ)	2:38:26	
57	Andrew Smith (GUY)	2:39:45	
58	Lwan Thu (MYA)	2:45:34	
59	Georges Richmond (TAH)	2:45:36	
60	Trpe Martinovski (MKD)	2:48:36	
61	Sean Quilty (AUS)	2:48:58	
62	Bouh Omar Moussa (DJI)	2:52:33	
63	Daviano Aviles (MEX)	2:53:24	
64	Richard Rodriguez (ARU)	2:53:51	
65	To Rithya (CAM)	2:59:20	
DID NOT FINISH (DNF)
—	Philippe Rémond (FRA)	DNF	
—	Luis Soares (FRA)	DNF	
—	Roman Kejžar (SLO)	DNF	
—	Manukau Teuribaki (KIR)	DNF	
—	Patrick Ntambwe (COD)	DNF	
—	Vilayvanh Phachansili (LAO)	DNF	
—	Ali Mohamed Abdi (DJI)	DNF	
—	Antoni Peña (ESP)	DNF	
—	Keith Brantly (USA)	DNF	
—	Zebedayo Bayo (TAN)	DNF	
—	Ghadid Omar Daher (DJI)	DNF	
—	Fabián Roncero (ESP)	DNF	
—	Shaun Creighton (AUS)	DNF	
—	Abdelfattah Aïtzouri (MAR)	DNF	
—	António Salvador (POR)	DNF	
DID NOT START (DNS)
—	Nazirdin Akylbekov (KGZ)	DNS	
—	Benjamín Paredes (MEX)	DNS	
—	Ahmed Salah (DJI)	DNS	

== See also ==
- 1999 World Marathon Cup
- Men's Olympic Marathon (2000)
