= 1995 World Championships in Athletics – Men's 10,000 metres =

The Men's 10,000 metres event featured at the 1995 World Championships in Gothenburg, Sweden. There were a total number of 41 participating athletes, with two qualifying heats and the final was held on 8 August 1995.

== Final ==
| RANK | FINAL | TIME |
|---|---|---|
| | Haile Gebrselassie (ETH) | 27:12.95 |
| | Khalid Skah (MAR) | 27:14.53 |
| | Paul Tergat (KEN) | 27:14.70 |
| 4. | Salah Hissou (MAR) | 27:14.70 |
| 5. | Josephat Machuka (KEN) | 27:23.72 |
| 6. | Joseph Kimani (KEN) | 27:30.02 |
| 7. | Stéphane Franke (GER) | 27:48.88 |
| 8. | Paulo Guerra (POR) | 27:52.55 |
| 9. | Todd Williams (USA) | 27:52.87 |
| 10. | Toshiyuki Hayata (JPN) | 27:53.12 |
| 11. | Domingos Castro (POR) | 27:53.42 |
| 12. | Yasuyuki Watanabe (JPN) | 27:53.82 |
| 13. | Germán Silva (MEX) | 27:55.34 |
| 14. | Assefa Mezgebu (ETH) | 27:56.06 |
| 15. | Mathias Ntawulikura (RWA) | 27:57.92 |
| 16. | Alejandro Gómez (ESP) | 27:59.38 |
| 17. | Hendrick Ramaala (RSA) | 28:00.08 |
| 18. | Stefano Baldini (ITA) | 28:08.39 |
| 19. | António Pinto (POR) | 28:26.42 |
| — | Abel Antón (ESP) | DNF |

== Qualifying heats ==
- Held on Saturday 1995-08-05

| RANK | HEAT 1 | TIME |
|---|---|---|
| 1. | Haile Gebrselassie (ETH) | 28:10.66 |
| 2. | Paul Tergat (KEN) | 28:10.78 |
| 3. | António Pinto (POR) | 28:11.47 |
| 4. | Paulo Guerra (POR) | 28:11.94 |
| 5. | Assefa Mezgebu (ETH) | 28:11.96 |
| 6. | Khalid Skah (MAR) | 28:11.99 |
| 7. | Toshiyuki Hayata (JPN) | 28:12.77 |
| 8. | Todd Williams (USA) | 28:13.83 |
| 9. | Paul Evans (GBR) | 28:14.76 |
| 10. | Stephan Freigang (GER) | 28:17.04 |
| 11. | Martin Pitayo (MEX) | 28:24.20 |
| 12. | Rolando Vera (ECU) | 28:33.10 |
| 13. | Andrew Panga (TAN) | 28:44.44 |
| 14. | Kenji Takao (JPN) | 28:47.01 |
| 15. | Antonio Serrano (ESP) | 28:51.37 |
| 16. | Jeff Schiebler (CAN) | 29:12.20 |
| 17. | Arnold Machler (SUI) | 29:33.77 |
| 18. | Charles Mulinga (ZAM) | 30:06.49 |
| 19. | Adermaz Ismael Ould (MTN) | 33:04.49 (NR) |
| — | Robbie Johnston (NZL) | DNF |
| — | Alyan Sultan Al-Qahtani (KSA) | DNF |

| RANK | HEAT 2 | TIME |
|---|---|---|
| 1. | Josephat Machuka (KEN) | 27:29.07 |
| 2. | Joseph Kimani (KEN) | 27:35.20 |
| 3. | Salah Hissou (MAR) | 27:47.20 |
| 4. | Mathias Ntawulikura (RWA) | 27:47.93 |
| 5. | Domingos Castro (POR) | 27:48.19 |
| 6. | Yasuyuki Watanabe (JPN) | 27:48.55 |
| 7. | Germán Silva (MEX) | 27:49.07 |
| 8. | Stefano Baldini (ITA) | 27:50.27 |
| 9. | Stéphane Franke (GER) | 27:50.93 |
| 10. | Abel Antón (ESP) | 27:51.37 |
| 11. | Alejandro Gómez (ESP) | 27:51.64 |
| 12. | Hendrick Ramaala (RSA) | 27:54.59 |
| 13. | Chris Fox (USA) | 28:32.67 |
| 14. | Jorge Marquez (MEX) | 28:53.02 |
| 15. | Miroslav Vanko (SVK) | 28:53.69 |
| 16. | Tom Ansberry (USA) | 29:01.43 |
| 17. | Noel Berkeley (IRL) | 29:16.69 |
| — | Aloys Nizigama (BDI) | DNF |
| — | Antonio Silio (ARG) | DNF |
| — | Fita Bayisa (ETH) | DNS |

== See also ==
- 1993 Men's World Championships 10.000 metres
- 1996 Men's Olympic 10.000 metres
- 1997 Men's World Championships 10.000 metres
