= Vincenzo Modica =

Italian long-distance runner

Personal information
- Nickname: Massimo
- Nationality: Italian
- Born: March 2, 1971 (age 55) Mistretta, Italy
- Height: 1.69 m (5 ft 6 1/2 in)
- Weight: 65 kg (143 lb)

Sport
- Country: Italy
- Sport: Athletics
- Event: Marathon
- Club: G.S. Fiamme Oro

Achievements and titles
- Personal bests: Half marathon: 1:01:03 (1993); Marathon: 2:11:39 (1996)
Medal record
Men's athletics
Representing Italy
World Championships
Silver medal – second place	1999 Sevilla	Marathon
European Championships
Bronze medal – third place	1998 Budapest	Marathon
European Marathon Cup
Gold medal – first place	1998 Budapest	Team
Bronze medal – third place	1998 Budapest	Individual
World Half Marathon Championships
Bronze medal – third place	2001 Montbéliard-Belfort	Team
European 10,000m Cup
Silver medal – second place	1997 Barakaldo	Team
Summer Universiade
Bronze medal – third place	1993 Buffalo	10,000 m

Vincenzo Massimo Modica (born 2 March 1971) is an Italian long-distance runner who competed in the marathon.

He was the bronze medallist in that event at the 1998 European Athletics Championships then took the silver medal behind Abel Antón at the 1999 World Championships in Athletics.

== Biography ==
He was a six-time participant at the IAAF World Cross Country Championships and was twice in the top twenty of the junior race. He represented Italy in the marathon at the 2000 Sydney Olympics, but failed to finish the race.

== Achievements ==
Year	Competition	Venue	Position	Event	Notes
Representing Italy
1990	World Junior Championships	Plovdiv, Bulgaria	7th	10,000m	29:09.06
1994	European Championships	Helsinki, Finland	11th	10,000 m	28:17.24
1997	World Championships	Athens, Greece	—	Marathon	DNF
1998	European Championships	Budapest, Hungary	3rd	Marathon	2:12:53
1999	World Championships	Seville, Spain	2nd	Marathon	2:14:03
2000	Olympic Games	Sydney, Australia	—	Marathon	DNF

== National titles ==
Vincenzo Modica has won 8 times the individual national championship.

- 2 wins in 10000 metres (1991, 1999)
- 3 wins in Half marathon (1992, 1993, 1994)
- 1 win in Marathon (2005)
- 2 wins in Cross country running (1993, 1997)

== See also ==
- Italian all-time lists - half marathon
