= Uchikoshi =

Uchikoshi (written: 打越) is a Japanese surname. Notable people with the surname include:

- Kotaro Uchikoshi (打越 鋼太郎, born 1973), Japanese video game director and scenario writer
- Tadao Uchikoshi (打越 忠夫, born 1965), Japanese long-distance runner
