= 1994 European Athletics Championships – Men's 10,000 metres =

Men's 10,000 metres at the European Athletics Championships

These are the official results of the Men's 10,000 metres event at the 1994 European Championships in Helsinki, Finland. The final was held at Helsinki Olympic Stadium on 7 August 1994.

== Medalists ==
Gold	Abel Antón; Spain
Silver	Vincent Rousseau; Belgium
Bronze	Stéphane Franke; Germany

== Final ==
Rank	Final	Time
	Abel Antón (ESP)	28:06.03
	Vincent Rousseau (BEL)	28:06.63
	Stéphane Franke (GER)	28:07.95
4.	Róbert Štefko (SVK)	28:08.02
5.	Paulo Guerra (POR)	28:10.18
6.	João Junqueira (POR)	28:10.55
7.	Jan Pešava (CZE)	28:10.73
8.	Carlos de la Torre (ESP)	28:10.77
9.	Mohamed Ezzher (FRA)	28:12.54
10.	Stephan Freigang (GER)	28:15.98
11.	Vincenzo Modica (ITA)	28:17.24
12.	Zoltán Káldy (HUN)	28:22.00
13.	Antonio Martins (FRA)	28:23.87
14.	Khristo Stefanov (BUL)	28:24.47
15.	Gary Staines (GBR)	28:25.60
16.	Antonio Serrano (ESP)	28:31.75
17.	Domingos Castro (POR)	28:33.89
18.	Cormac Finnerty (IRL)	28:34.63
19.	Risto Ulmala (FIN)	28:39.26
20.	Stefano Baldini (ITA)	28:41.82
21.	Noel Berkeley (IRL)	28:47.62
22.	Justin Hobbs (GBR)	29:28.08
23.	Sławomir Kąpiński (POL)	29:59.93
—	Francesco Panetta (ITA)	DNF

== Participation ==
According to an unofficial count, 24 athletes from 14 countries participated in the event.

- Belgium (1)
- Bulgaria (1)
- Czech Republic (1)
- Finland (1)
- France (2)
- Germany (2)
- Hungary (1)
- Ireland (2)
- Italy (3)
- Poland (1)
- Portugal (3)
- Slovakia (1)
- Spain (3)
- United Kingdom (2)

== See also ==
- 1992 Men's Olympic 10,000 metres (Barcelona)
- 1993 Men's World Championships 10,000 metres (Stuttgart)
- 1995 Men's World Championships 10,000 metres (Gothenburg)
- 1996 Men's Olympic 10,000 metres (Atlanta)
