= Kim Jeong-su =

- Hangul: 김정수
- RR: Gim Jeongsu
- MR: Kim Chŏngsu

Kim Jeong-su, Kim Jung-soo or Kim Jong-su (Korean: 김정수) may also refer to:

- Kim Jong-su (runner) (born 1970), North Korean long-distance runner
- Kim Jung-soo (baseball), player for the Kia Tigers
- Kim Jung-soo (footballer) (born 1975), South Korean footballer
- Kim Jung-soo (politician), South Korean government official
- Kim Jung-soo (martial artist), South Korean Taekwondo champion
- Kim Jong-su (born 1977), North Korean sport shooter
- Kim Jung-su (born 1981), South Korean bobsledder
- Kim Jung-soo (businesswoman) (born 1964), South Korean businesswoman known for launching Buldak Ramen
