= Masaki Oya =

Masaki Oya may refer to:

- Masaki Oya (athlete)
- Masaki Oya (volleyball)
