= Paulo Guerra =

Portuguese long-distance runner

Medal record

Men's athletics

Representing Portugal

World Cross Country Championships
Bronze medal – third place	1993 Belfast	Long race team
Bronze medal – third place	1999 Belfast	Long race individual
Bronze medal – third place	1999 Belfast	Long race team
Bronze medal – third place	2000 Vilamoura	Long race team

European Cross Country Championships
Gold medal – first place	1994 Alnwick	Individual
Gold medal – first place	1994 Alnwick	Team
Gold medal – first place	1995 Alnwick	Individual
Gold medal – first place	1996 Charleroi	Team
Gold medal – first place	1999 Velenje	Individual
Gold medal – first place	2000 Malmö	Individual
Silver medal – second place	1995 Alnwick	Team
Silver medal – second place	1996 Charleroi	Individual
Silver medal – second place	1998 Ferrara	Team
Silver medal – second place	1999 Velenje	Team
Silver medal – second place	2001 Thun	Team

Paulo Alexandre Martins Guerra (born 21 August 1970 in Barrancos) is a Portuguese former long-distance runner who specialized in the 10,000 metres and cross-country running. After 2001 he mainly ran half marathons.

== International competitions ==
Year	Competition	Venue	Position	Event	Notes
Representing Portugal
1993	World Cross Country Championships	Amorebieta, Spain	21st	Long race (11.75 km)	34:01
1993	World Cross Country Championships	Amorebieta, Spain	3rd	Team competition	167 pts
1994	World Cross Country Championships	Budapest, Hungary	13th	Long race (12.06 km)	35:27
1994	World Cross Country Championships	Budapest, Hungary	5th	Team competition	212 pts
1994	European Championships	Helsinki, Finland	5th	10,000 m	28:10.18
1995	World Cross Country Championships	Durham, United Kingdom	6th	Long race (12.02 km)	34:38
1995	World Cross Country Championships	Durham, United Kingdom	4th	Team competition	139 pts
1995	World Championships	Gothenburg, Sweden	8th	10,000 m	27:52.55
1997	World Cross Country Championships	Turin, Italy	26th	Long race (12.333 km)	36:46
1997	World Cross Country Championships	Turin, Italy	4th	Team competition	263 pts
1998	World Cross Country Championships	Marrakesh, Morocco	12th	Long race (12 km)	34:59
1998	World Cross Country Championships	Marrakesh, Morocco	4th	Team competition	74 pts
1998	European Championships	Budapest, Hungary	14th	10,000 m	28:52.66
1999	World Cross Country Championships	Belfast, United Kingdom	3rd	Long race (12 km)	38:46
1999	World Cross Country Championships	Belfast, United Kingdom	3rd	Team competition	76 pts
2000	World Cross Country Championships	Vilamoura, Portugal	25th	Long race (12.3 km)	36:44
2000	World Cross Country Championships	Vilamoura, Portugal	3rd	Team competition	69 pts
2001	World Cross Country Championships	Ostend, Belgium	4th	Long race (12.3 km)	40:06
2001	World Cross Country Championships	Ostend, Belgium	5th	Team competition	100 pts

== Personal bests ==
- 1500 metres – 3:45.21 min (1995)
- 3000 metres – 7:49.94 min (1996)
- 3000 metres steeplechase – 8:43.86 min (1991)
- 5000 metres – 13:18.59 min (1995)
- 10,000 metres – 27:50.17 min (1998)
- Half marathon – 1:01:53 hrs (1996)
- Marathon – 2:11:02 hrs (1998)
