= Kasirayi Sita =

Zimbabwean long-distance runner (born 1978)

Kasirayi Sita (born 29 July 1978) is a male long-distance runner from Zimbabwe. He won the 2005 edition of the Stockholm Marathon. Sita set his personal best (2:12:42) in the men's marathon on 9 October 2005 in Eindhoven.

== Achievements ==
Year	Competition	Venue	Position	Event	Notes
Representing Zimbabwe
2005	Stockholm Marathon	Stockholm, Sweden	1st	Marathon	2:13:28
