= Oleg Strizhakov =

Russian long-distance runner

Oleg Filippovich Strizhakov (Russian: Олег Филиппович Стрижаков; born 18 July 1963 in Tbilisi, Georgian SSR) is a retired Russian long-distance runner.

He won the silver medal in 10,000 metres at the 1994 Goodwill Games and finished thirteenth in the marathon race at the 1995 World Championships.

== International competitions ==
Year	Competition	Venue	Position	Event	Notes
Representing Russia
1994	European Championships	Helsinki, Finland	12th	Marathon	2:14:23
1995	World Championships	Gothenburg, Sweden	13th	Marathon	2:17:50
1996	Olympic Games	Atlanta, United States	37th	Marathon	2:19:51
1998	European Championships	Budapest, Hungary	18th	Marathon	2:15:51
