= Stéphane Franke =

German long-distance runner (1964–2011)

Medal record

Men's athletics

Representing Germany

European Championships
Bronze medal – third place	1994 Helsinki	10,000 m
Bronze medal – third place	1998 Budapest	10,000 m

Stéphane Franke (12 February 1964 – 23 June 2011) was a long-distance runner representing Germany, who twice won the bronze medal in the men's 10.000 metres at the European Championships (1994 and 1998). He represented Germany twice at the Summer Olympics, in 1992 (Barcelona) and 1996 in Atlanta.

Having been born in Versailles, France, Franke also held French citizenship. At age five, he moved to Bergisch Gladbach with his family. Eventually they made their home in Filderstadt, near Stuttgart. Franke joined SV Salamander Kornwestheim from Kornwestheim, also near Stuttgart. In 1997, he moved to Berlin and became part of SC Charlottenburg Berlin.

He died in Potsdam, Germany, on 23 June 2011 of lymphatic cancer, within five weeks of being diagnosed with the disease, at the age of 47.

== Achievements ==
Year	Competition	Venue	Position	Event	Notes
Representing Germany
1991	World Championships	Tokyo, Japan	12th	10.000m	28:20.00
1992	Olympic Games	Barcelona, Spain	14th Heat 1	10.000m	28:52.83
1993	World Championships	Stuttgart, Germany	4th	10.000m	28:10.69
1994	European Championships	Helsinki, Finland	10th	5000m	13:45.67
1994	European Championships	Helsinki, Finland	3rd	10,000m	28:07.95
1995	World Championships	Gothenburg, Sweden	7th	10.000m	27:48.88
1996	Olympic Games	Atlanta, United States	9th	10.000m	27:59.08
1997	World Championships	Athens, Greece	31st	Marathon	2:23:53
1998	European Championships	Budapest, Hungary	3rd	10.000m	27:59.90
