= 1998 European Athletics Championships – Men's marathon =

Men's marathon at the European Athletics Championships

These are the official results of the Men's Marathon competition at the 1998 European Championships in Budapest, Hungary. The race was held on Saturday August 22, 1998. Italian runners, led by Stefano Baldini, swept the medals.

== Medalists ==
| Gold | Stefano Baldini; Italy (ITA) |
| Silver | Danilo Goffi; Italy (ITA) |
| Bronze | Vincenzo Modica; Italy (ITA) |

== Abbreviations ==
- All times shown are in hours:minutes:seconds

| DNS | did not start |
| NM | no mark |
| WR | world record |
| AR | area record |
| NR | national record |
| PB | personal best |
| SB | season best |

== Records ==
Standing records prior to the 1998 European Athletics Championships
| World Record | Belayneh Densamo (ETH) | 2:06:50 | April 17, 1988 | Rotterdam, Netherlands |
| Event Record | Martín Fiz (ESP) | 2:10:31 | August 14, 1994 | Helsinki, Finland |

== Final ranking ==
| Rank | Athlete | Time | Note |
|---|---|---|---|
| 1st place, gold medalist(s) | Stefano Baldini (ITA) | 2:12:01 | |
| 2nd place, silver medalist(s) | Danilo Goffi (ITA) | 2:12:11 | |
| 3rd place, bronze medalist(s) | Vincenzo Modica (ITA) | 2:12:53 | |
| 4 | Julio Rey (ESP) | 2:13:17 | |
| 5 | Alejandro Gómez (ESP) | 2:13:23 | |
| 6 | Antoni Peña (ESP) | 2:13:53 | |
| 7 | Giovanni Ruggiero (ITA) | 2:13:59 | |
| 8 | Richard Nerurkar (GBR) | 2:14:02 | |
| 9 | João Lopes (POR) | 2:14:19 | |
| 10 | António Salvador (POR) | 2:14:28 | |
| 11 | Abdelhakim Bagy (FRA) | 2:14:48 | |
| 12 | Antonio Serrano (ESP) | 2:14:58 | |
| 13 | Muhhamed Mazipov (RUS) | 2:15:12 | |
| 14 | Harri Hänninen (FIN) | 2:15:13 | |
| 15 | Paulo Catarino (POR) | 2:15:27 | |
| 16 | Henrique Crisostomo (POR) | 2:15:38 | |
| 17 | Bjarne Thysell (SWE) | 2:15:43 | |
| 18 | Oleg Strizhakov (RUS) | 2:15:51 | |
| 19 | Michael Fietz (GER) | 2:15:53 | |
| 20 | Ottaviano Andriani (ITA) | 2:16:28 | |
| 21 | Nikolaos Pollias (GRE) | 2:16:36 | |
| 22 | Pascal Blanchard (FRA) | 2:16:38 | |
| 23 | Jean-Pierre Monciaux (FRA) | 2:17:11 | |
| 24 | Stephan Freigang (GER) | 2:17:24 | |
| 25 | Anders Szalkai (SWE) | 2:17:40 | |
| 26 | Joaquim Silva (POR) | 2:17:55 | |
| 27 | Gergely Rezessy (HUN) | 2:17:58 | |
| 28 | David Buzza (GBR) | 2:19:28 | |
| 29 | Pavel Loskutov (EST) | 2:19:38 | |
| 30 | Mark Hudspith (GBR) | 2:19:58 | |
| 31 | Martón Lajtos (HUN) | 2:21:22 | |
| 32 | Eduard Tukhbatullin (RUS) | 2:21:38 | |
| 33 | Zoltán Holbá (HUN) | 2:22:01 | |
| 34 | Sergey Kaledin (RUS) | 2:22:55 | |
| 35 | Bertrand Itsweire (FRA) | 2:23:01 | |
| 36 | Andrey Shalagin (RUS) | 2:23:05 | |
| 37 | Ferenc Sagi (HUN) | 2:26:53 | |
| 38 | Valeriu Vlas (MDA) | 2:27:28 | |
| 39 | Peter Jager (HUN) | 2:29:49 | |
| 40 | Janos Szeman (HUN) | 2:33:51 | |
DID NOT FINISH (DNF)
| — | Dominique Chauvelier (FRA) | DNF | |
| — | Spyros Andriopoulos (GRE) | DNF | |
| — | Giacomo Leone (ITA) | DNF | |
| — | Philippe Rémond (FRA) | DNF | |
| — | Diego Garcia (ESP) | DNF | |
| — | José Manuel García (ESP) | DNF | |

== Marathon Cup ==
The team's time is given by the first three arrivals of each country, but awarded with the medal also the others athletes of the team that finished the race.

| Rank | Athletes | Nationality | Mark |
|---|---|---|---|
| 1 | Stefano Baldini, Danilo Goffi, Vincenzo Modica. Giovanni Ruggiero, Ottaviano Andriani | Italy | 6:37:05 |
| 2 | José Ramón Rey, Alejandro Gómez, Antoni Peña | Spain | 6:40:33 |
| 3 | João Lopes, António Salvador, Paulo Catarino | Portugal | 6:44:14 |
| 4 | Hakim Bagy, Pascal Blanchard, Jean-Pierre Monciaux | France | 6:48:37 |
| 5 | Mukhamet Nazipov, Oleg Strizhakov, Eduard Tukhbatullin | Russia | 6:52:41 |
| 6 | Richard Nerurkar, Dave Buzza, Mark Hudspith | United Kingdom | 6:53:28 |
| 7 | Gergely Rezessy, Márton Lajtos, Zoltán Holba | Hungary | 7:01:21 |

== See also ==
- 1998 European Marathon Cup
