= 1990 World Junior Championships in Athletics – Men's 10,000 metres =

The men's 10,000 metres event at the 1990 World Junior Championships in Athletics was held in Plovdiv, Bulgaria, at Deveti Septemvri Stadium on 8 August.

== Medalists ==
| Gold | Richard Chelimo; Kenya |
| Silver | Ismael Kirui; Kenya |
| Bronze | Juma Ninga; Tanzania |

== Results ==
=== Final ===
8 August

| Rank | Name | Nationality | Time | Notes |
|---|---|---|---|---|
| 1st place, gold medalist(s) | Richard Chelimo | Kenya | 28:18.57 | |
| 2nd place, silver medalist(s) | Ismael Kirui | Kenya | 28:40.77 | |
| 3rd place, bronze medalist(s) | Juma Ninga | Tanzania | 28:41.90 | |
| 4 | Abraham Assefa | Ethiopia | 28:43.22 | |
| 5 | Christian Leuprecht | Italy | 28:51.80 | |
| 6 | Tesgie Legesse | Ethiopia | 29:01.61 | |
| 7 | Vincenzo Modica | Italy | 29:09.06 | |
| 8 | Mike Mykytok | United States | 29:29.45 | |
| 9 | Domingos Lopes | Portugal | 29:31.05 | |
| 10 | Muchapiwa Mazano | Zimbabwe | 29:32.19 | |
| 11 | Mohamed Riad | Morocco | 29:36.19 | |
| 12 | Meta Petro | Tanzania | 29:37.82 | |
| 13 | Robinson Semolini | Brazil | 30:00.01 | |
| 14 | Hernán Orcellet | Argentina | 30:19.59 | |
| 15 | José Luis Francisco | Spain | 30:24.48 | |
| 16 | Tom Van Hooste | Belgium | 30:33.60 | |
| 17 | Javier Caballero | Spain | 30:35.27 | |
| 18 | Stanislav Yordanov | Soviet Union | 30:55.13 | |
| 19 | Hicham Louahbi | Morocco | 30:58.05 | |
| 20 | Delfim Conceição | Portugal | 31:03.69 | |
| 21 | Jeff Schiebler | Canada | 31:13.63 | |
| 22 | Seiji Kushibe | Japan | 31:43.75 | |
| 23 | Conor Holt | Ireland | 31:45.24 | |
| 24 | Elisaldo León | Cuba | 32:23.96 | |
| 25 | Shigeki Iketani | Japan | 32:34.11 | |
| | Yahia Azaidj | Algeria | DNF | |

== Participation ==
According to an unofficial count, 26 athletes from 18 countries participated in the event.

- Algeria (1)
- Argentina (1)
- Belgium (1)
- Brazil (1)
- Canada (1)
- Cuba (1)
- Ethiopia (2)
- Ireland (1)
- Italy (2)
- Japan (2)
- Kenya (2)
- Morocco (2)
- Portugal (2)
- Soviet Union (1)
- Spain (2)
- Tanzania (2)
- United States (1)
- Zimbabwe (1)
