= 2024 London Marathon =

44th annual marathon race in London

44th London Marathon
- Venue: London, England
- Date: 21 April 2024
- Competitors: 54,218

Champions
- Men: Alexander Mutiso (2:04:01)
- Women: Peres Jepchirchir (2:16:16)
- Wheelchair men: Marcel Hug (1:28:35)
- Wheelchair women: Catherine Debrunner (1:38:54)

The 2024 London Marathon was the 44th running of the London Marathon, it took place on 21 April 2024. The route included notable landmarks Buckingham Palace, Cutty Sark, Tower Bridge and Canary Wharf.

578,374 people applied to take part via a ballot, which was the most ever ballot entries for a marathon event, as recognized by the Guinness World Records.

== Race summary ==
Peres Jepchirchir was the women's winner of the 2024 London Marathon, and her time of two hours, 16 minutes and 16 seconds broke the women's only world record (that is, the world record for the fastest time by a female marathon runner without using male pace makers).

In this marathon Jeannie Rice set a new women’s marathon world record for the 75–79 age group, with a time of 3:33:27; she was 76 years old.

Also, in this marathon Dr. Julie McElroy became the first female frame runner to complete any London Marathon, which she did in five hours and 59 minutes.

== Results ==
=== Men ===
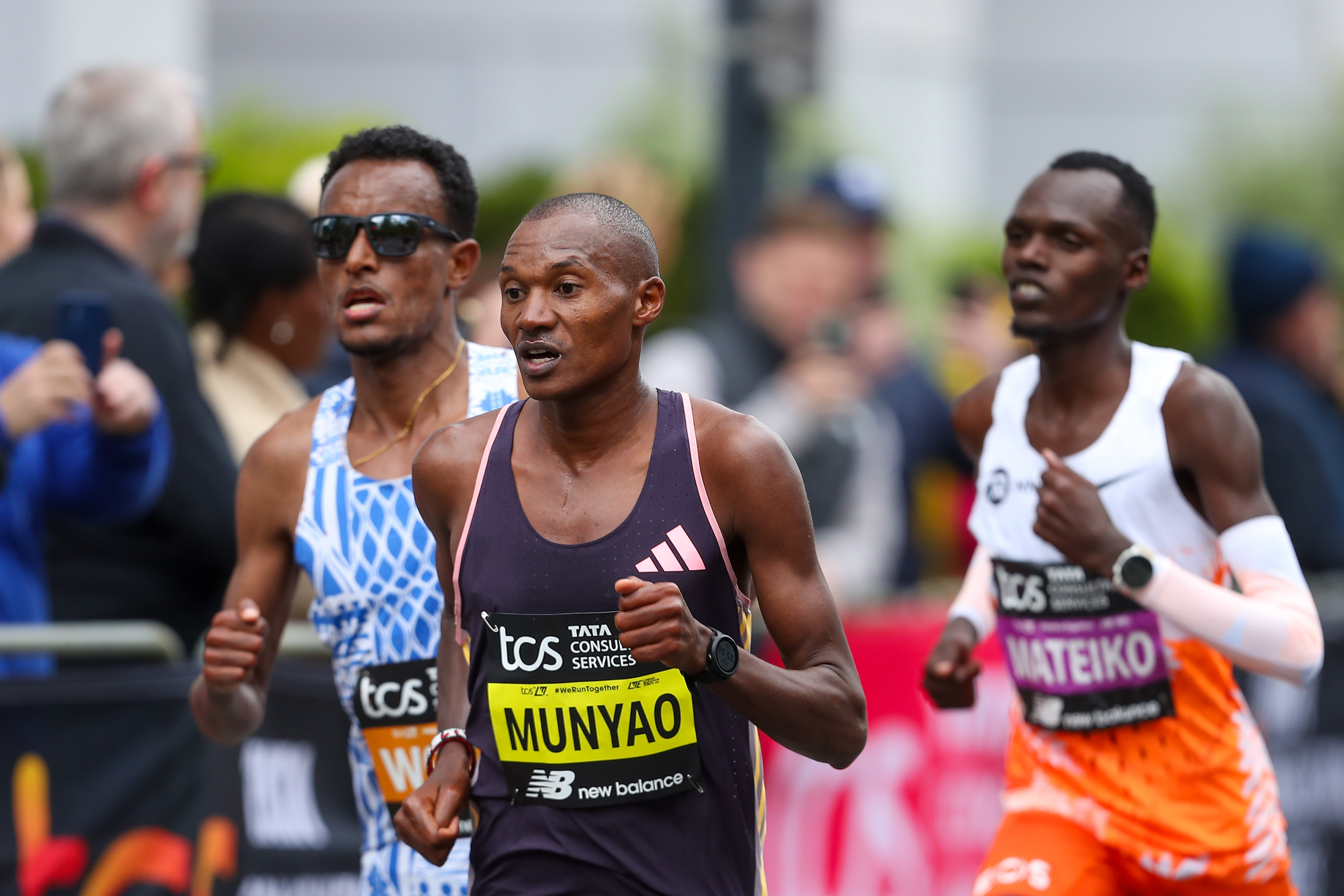
Alexander Mutiso Munyao won the elite men's event.

Elite men's top 10 finishers
Position	Athlete	Nationality	Time
1st place, gold medalist(s)	Alexander Mutiso	Kenya	02:04:01
2nd place, silver medalist(s)	Kenenisa Bekele	Ethiopia	02:04:15
3rd place, bronze medalist(s)	Emile Cairess	United Kingdom	02:06:46
4	Mahamed Mahamed	United Kingdom	02:07:05
5	Hassan Chahdi	France	02:07:30
6	Henok Tesfay	Eritrea	02:09:22
7	Hendrik Pfeiffer	Germany	02:10:00
8	Kinde Atanaw	Ethiopia	02:10:03
9	Johannes Motschmann	Germany	02:10:39
10	Brian Shrader	United States	02:10:50

=== Women ===
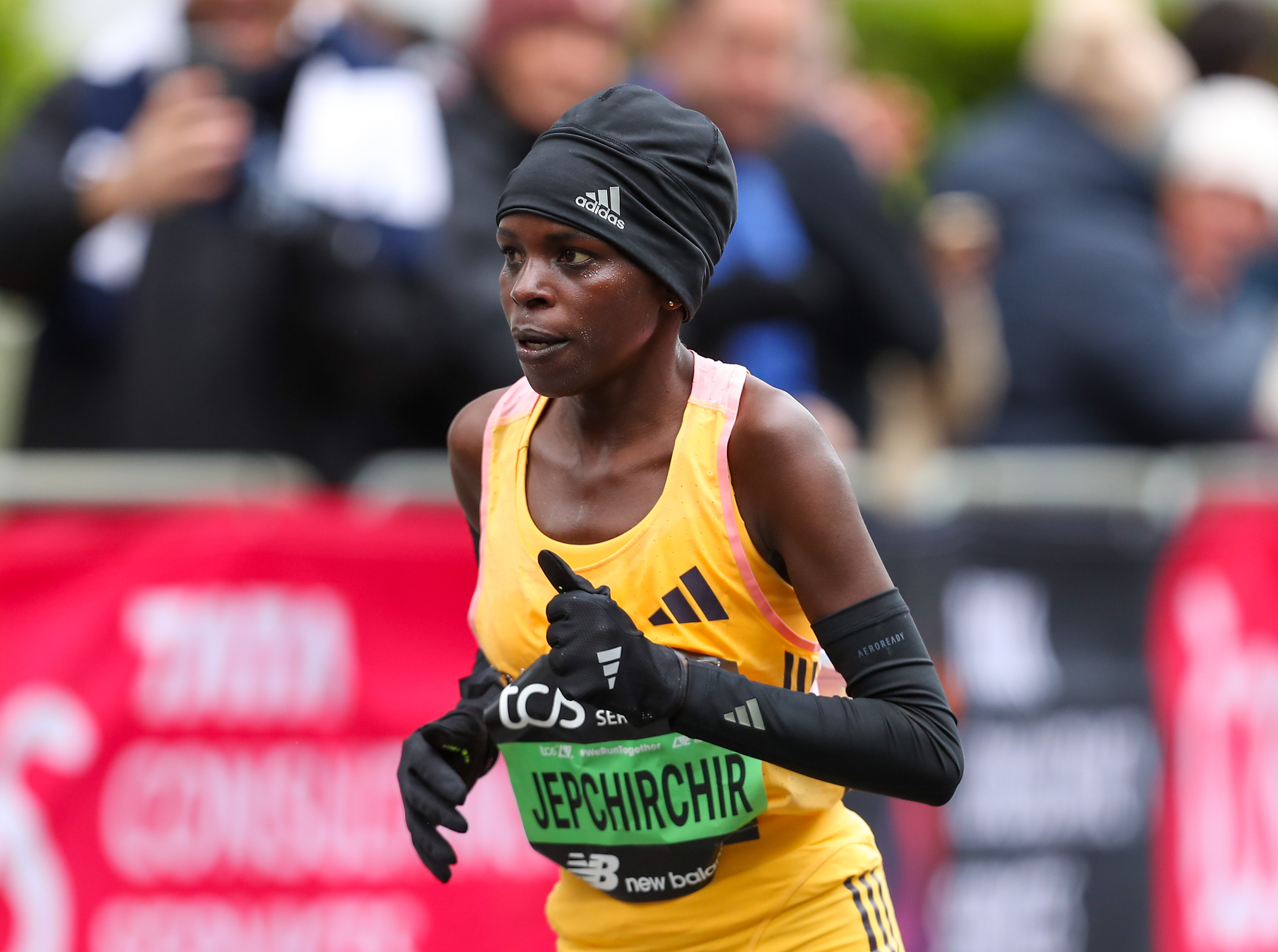
Peres Jepchirchir won the elite women's event.

Elite women's top 10 finishers
Position	Athlete	Nationality	Time
1st place, gold medalist(s)	Peres Jepchirchir	Kenya	02:16:16
2nd place, silver medalist(s)	Tigst Assefa	Ethiopia	02:16:23
3rd place, bronze medalist(s)	Joyciline Jepkosgei	Kenya	02:16:24
4	Megertu Alemu	Ethiopia	02:16:34
5	Brigid Kosgei	Kenya	02:19:02
6	Sheila Chepkirui	Kenya	02:19:31
7	Tigist Ketema	Ethiopia	02:23:21
8	Yalemzerf Yehualaw	Ethiopia	02:23:26
9	Ruth Chepngetich	Kenya	02:24:36
10	Tsige Haileslase	Ethiopia	02:25:03

=== Wheelchair men ===
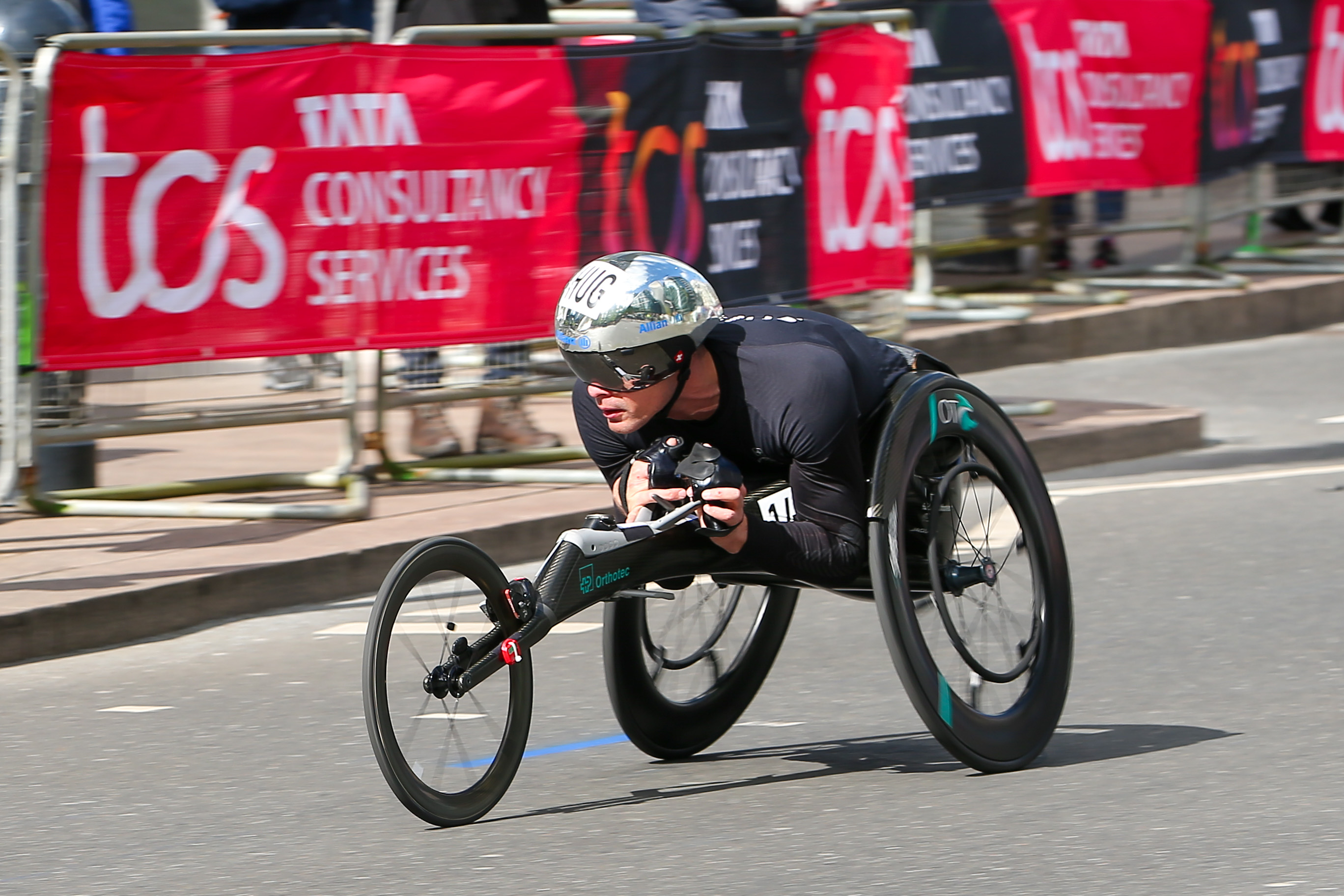
Marcel Hug won the wheelchair men's event.

Wheelchair men's top 10 finishers
Position	Athlete	Nationality	Time
1st place, gold medalist(s)	Marcel Hug	Switzerland	01:28:35
2nd place, silver medalist(s)	Daniel Romanchuk	United States	01:29:06
3rd place, bronze medalist(s)	David Weir	United Kingdom	01:29:58
4	Tomoki Suzuki	Japan	01:30:42
5	Sho Watanabe	Japan	01:30:42
6	Aaron Pike	United States	01:35:35
7	Geert Schipper	Netherlands	01:35:36
8	Joshua Cassidy	Canada	01:35:40
9	Evan Correll	United States	01:36:59
10	Johnboy Smith	United Kingdom	01:37:00

=== Wheelchair women ===
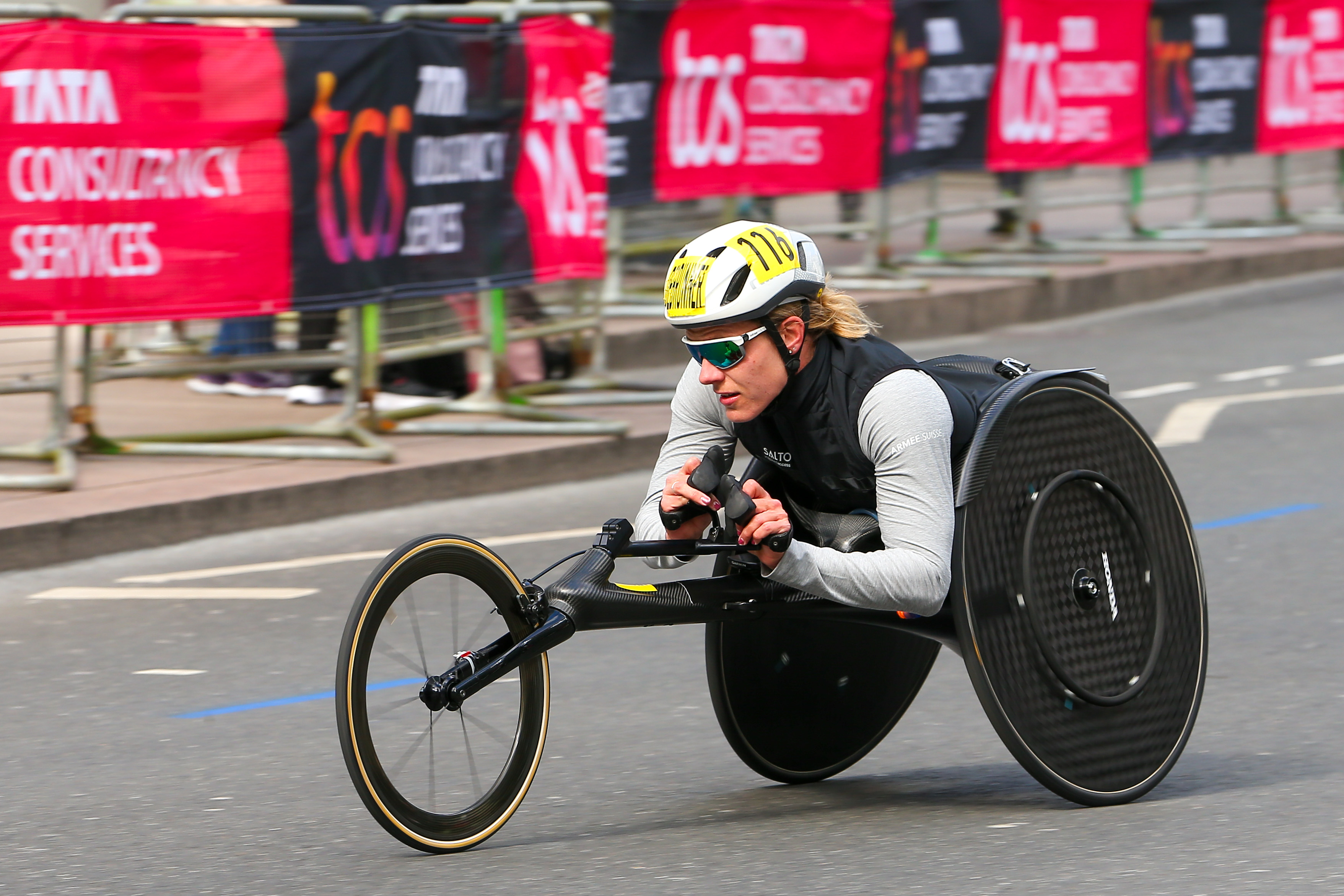
Catherine Debrunner won the wheelchair women's event.

Wheelchair women's top 10 finishers
Position	Athlete	Nationality	Time
1st place, gold medalist(s)	Catherine Debrunner	Switzerland	01:38:54
2nd place, silver medalist(s)	Manuela Schär	Switzerland	01:45:00
3rd place, bronze medalist(s)	Tatyana McFadden	United States	01:45:51
4	Madison de Rozario	Australia	01:45:54
5	Wakako Tsuchida	Japan	01:50:18
6	Eden Rainbow-Cooper	United Kingdom	01:50:39
7	Patricia Eachus	Switzerland	01:50:43
8	Vanessa de Souza	Brazil	01:50:43
9	Nikita den Boer	Netherlands	01:50:45
10	Jenna Fesemyer	United States	01:50:45

== See also ==
- London Marathon
- 2023 London Marathon
