= Valeriu Vlas =

Moldovan long-distance runner

Valeriu Vlas (born 6 August 1971 in Călărași) is a retired Moldovan long-distance runner who specialized in the marathon. His personal best time is 2:17:32 hours.

His career highlight was a 35th place at the 1999 World Championships. He also competed at the Olympic Games in 1996 and 2000 without reaching the final.

== Achievements ==
Year	Competition	Venue	Position	Event	Notes
Representing Moldova
1996	Olympic Games	Atlanta, United States	77th	Marathon	2:28:36
1998	European Championships	Budapest, Hungary	38th	Marathon	2:27:28
1999	World Championships	Seville, Spain	35th	Marathon	2:24:22
2000	Olympic Games	Sydney, Australia	55th	Marathon	2:24:35
