= Grete Kirkeberg =

Norwegian long-distance runner

Grete Jorunn Kirkeberg (born 3 September 1964) is a retired Norwegian long-distance runner who specialized in marathon races and cross-country running.

She was on the Norwegian team who won the silver medal at the 1994 IAAF World Half Marathon Championships, having finished 22nd in the individual race. Her highest place from the IAAF World Cross Country Championships was a fifteenth place from 1986. In the team competition there she finished sixth in 1987. She finished 21st in 10,000 metres at the 1986 European Championships and sixteenth in the marathon at the 1997 World Championships. She became Norwegian champion in 5000 m in 1985, 1986 and 1992, in 10,000 m in 1994 and 1996–1998 and in half marathon in 1993.

== Achievements ==
| Year | Competition | Venue | Position | Event | Notes |
Representing Norway
| 1986 | European Championships | Stuttgart, West Germany | 21st | 10,000 m | 33:06.87 |
| 1988 | Frankfurt Marathon | Frankfurt, West Germany | 1st | Marathon | 2:35:44 |
| 1993 | Stockholm Marathon | Stockholm, Sweden | 1st | Marathon | 2:37:58 |
| 1996 | Stockholm Marathon | Stockholm, Sweden | 1st | Marathon | 2:36:40 |
| 1997 | World Championships | Athens, Greece | 16th | Marathon | 2:41:05 |
| 1998 | Stockholm Marathon | Stockholm, Sweden | 1st | Marathon | 2:37:39 |
| 1998 | European Championships | Budapest, Hungary | — | Marathon | DNF |

== Personal bests ==
- 5000 metres – 15:45.98 min (1986) – tenth among Norwegian 5000 m runners.
- 10,000 metres – 32:37.99 min (1986) – sixth among Norwegian 10,000 m runners.
- Half marathon – 1:10:36 hrs (1986) – sixth among Norwegian half marathon runners.
- Marathon – 2:35:44 hrs (1988) – ninth among Norwegian marathon runners.
