= Danilo Goffi =

Italian marathon runner

Personal information
- Nationality: Italian
- Born: 3 December 1972 (age 53) Legnano, Italy
- Height: 1.73 m (5 ft 8 in)
- Weight: 52 kg (115 lb)

Sport
- Country: Italy
- Sport: Athletics
- Event: Marathon
- Club: C.S. Carabinieri
- Coached by: Giorgio Rondelli
- Retired: 2015

Achievements and titles
- Personal bests: 5000 me: 13:44.64 (1995); 10,000 m: 28:28.39 (1996); Half marathon: 1:01:23 (1996); Marathon: 2:08:33 (1998)
Medal record
Men's athletics
Representing Italy
World Half Marathon Championships
Bronze medal – third place	2001 Montbéliard-Belfort	Team
European Championships
Silver medal – second place	1998 Budapest	Marathon
European Marathon Cup
Gold medal – first place	1998 Budapest	Team
Gold medal – first place	2006 Gothenburg	Team
Silver medal – second place	1998 Budapest	Individual
European Junior Championships
Gold medal – first place	1991 Thessaloniki	10,000 m
International Marathons
Event	1st	2nd	3rd
Venice Marathon	1	1	0
Turin Marathon	1	1	0
Rotterdam Marathon	0	0	1

Danilo Goffi (born 3 December 1972 in Legnano) is a former Italian long-distance runner, who specializes in the marathon. He represented his country at the 1996 Summer Olympics and has also competed at the World Championships in Athletics. He was the silver medallist in the marathon at the 1998 European Athletics Championships.

He won two times the Italian national championships of the marathon; the first time in 1995 when he was 23 years old, and the second time, 19 years after in 2014 when he was 42.

== Biography ==
Goffi won the 1995 Venice Marathon and was part of the Italian bronze medal-winning team at the IAAF World Half Marathon Championships that year. He won the Turin Marathon in 2005 and also competed at the 2010 edition of the race, finishing in fifth place. He was the first Italian finisher at the 2011 Venice Marathon, coming in seventh place overall with his time of 2:14:41 hours.

== Achievements ==
Year	Competition	Venue	Position	Event	Notes
1991	European Junior Championships	Thessaloniki, Greece	1st	10,000 m	30:18.62
1995	Venice Marathon	Venice, Italy	1st	Marathon	2:09:26
1996	Olympic Games	Atlanta, United States	9th	Marathon	2:15:08
1997	World Championships	Athens, Greece	4th	Marathon	2:14:47
1998	European Championships	Budapest, Hungary	2nd	Marathon	2:12:11
1999	World Championships	Seville, Spain	5th	Marathon	2:14:50
2001	Berlin Marathon	Berlin, Germany	5th	Marathon	2:10:35
2002	European Championships	Munich, Germany	13th	Marathon	2:15:57
2006	European Championships	Gothenburg, Sweden	11th	Marathon	2:14:45

== National titles ==
- Italian Athletics Championships
  - 10,000 metres: 1999
  - Half marathon: 1996
  - Marathon: 1995, 2014

== See also ==
- Italian all-time lists - half marathon
- Italian all-time lists - Marathon
