= Nobuyuki Sato =

Japanese long-distance runner

Nobuyuki Satō (佐藤 信之, Satō Nobuyuki; born 8 August 1972 in Kariya, Aichi) is a former Japanese marathon runner. After finishing second in the Fukuoka Marathon 1998 with his career best of 2:08:48, he won the bronze medal at the 1999 World Championships in Athletics.

At the Olympics 2000, he finished in 41st place.

== Achievements ==
Year	Competition	Venue	Position	Event	Notes
Representing Japan
1997	Lake Biwa Marathon	Otsu, Japan	8th	Marathon	2:12:28
1998	Fukuoka Marathon	Fukuoka, Japan	2nd	Marathon	2:08:48
1999	World Championships	Seville, Spain	3rd	Marathon	2:14:07
2000	Olympic Games	Sydney, Australia	41st	Marathon	2:20:52
2001	Beijing Marathon	Beijing, PR China	4th	Marathon	2:10:32
2005	Tokyo Marathon	Tokyo, Japan	8th	Marathon	2:16:18
2005	Sapporo Hokkaido Marathon	Sapporo, Japan	8th	Marathon	2:18:34
