= Maximo Oliveras =

Puerto Rican athlete

Personal information
- Nationality: Puerto Rican
- Born: 2 February 1962 (age 63)

Sport
- Sport: Long-distance running
- Event: Marathon

Maximo Ortiz Oliveras (born 2 February 1962) is a Puerto Rican long-distance runner. He competed in the men's marathon at the 1996 Summer Olympics.

== Career ==
Oliveras achieved notable results in U.S. road races. He ran 2:18:21 to place 10th at the 1995 Pittsburgh Marathon and 36th at the 1995 New York City Marathon. In the lead-up to the 1996 Olympics, he improved his position to 5th in a personal best of 2:18:04 at the 1996 Pittsburgh Marathon.

At the Atlanta Olympic marathon, Oliveras ran 2:47:15 hours to finish 106th. He was Puerto Rico's only marathoner at the Games.

Three months later, Oliveras entered the 1996 Harrisburg Marathon, a small race in Harrisburg, Pennsylvania. He chose to run in Harrisburg instead of the New York City Marathon because he was told that there would be more prize money if he won in Harrisburg. However, the day before the race he was informed that Harrisburg only offered trophies and no prize money to the winners. After contemplating dropping out, he eventually decided to run the race anyways, winning in a time of 2:25:45. Oliveras set a record for the newly drawn course, leading from the front throughout his race and winning by over nine minutes.

The following year, Oliveras finished 11th at the 1997 Cleveland Marathon in a time of 2:19:56. It was his third performance under 2 hours and 20 minutes.

Oliveras finished as the 2nd American at the 2000 Boston Marathon, which was noted for its windy conditions. He ran with the top American, Jamie Hibell, for 18 miles, exchanging the lead to block the wind. Hibell, who had not met Oliveras before, did not know that Oliveras only spoke Spanish and was confused when Oliveras didn't respond to his comments during the race. Hibell passed Oliveras on Heartbreak Hill and Oliveras finished 26th overall in 2:23:06.

Oliveras continued to compete in races in the Puerto Rico and Florida area, finishing 19th at the 2001 San Blas Half Marathon in Coamo and 5th at the 2005 Miami Marathon half-marathon race.

== Personal life ==
Oliveras is from Corozal, Puerto Rico. He speaks only Spanish, but he has an English-speaking sister who lives in Harrisburg, Pennsylvania. He has a son who he dedicated his Harrisburg Marathon win to.
