= Thabisio Ralekhetla =

Lesotho long-distance runner

Personal information
- Nationality: Lesotho
- Born: 3 March 1960 (age 66)

Sport
- Sport: Long-distance running
- Event: Marathon

Thabisio Ralekhetla (born 3 March 1960) is a Lesotho long-distance runner. He competed in the men's marathon at the 1996 Summer Olympics.
