= Anders Szalkai =

Swedish long-distance runner

Pal Anders Szalkai (born 17 April 1970 in Bårslöv, Helsingborg Municipality, Skåne) is a long-distance runner from Sweden. He represented his native country at the 1996 Summer Olympics in the men's marathon, finishing in 64th place. Szalkai won the 2001 edition of the Stockholm Marathon.

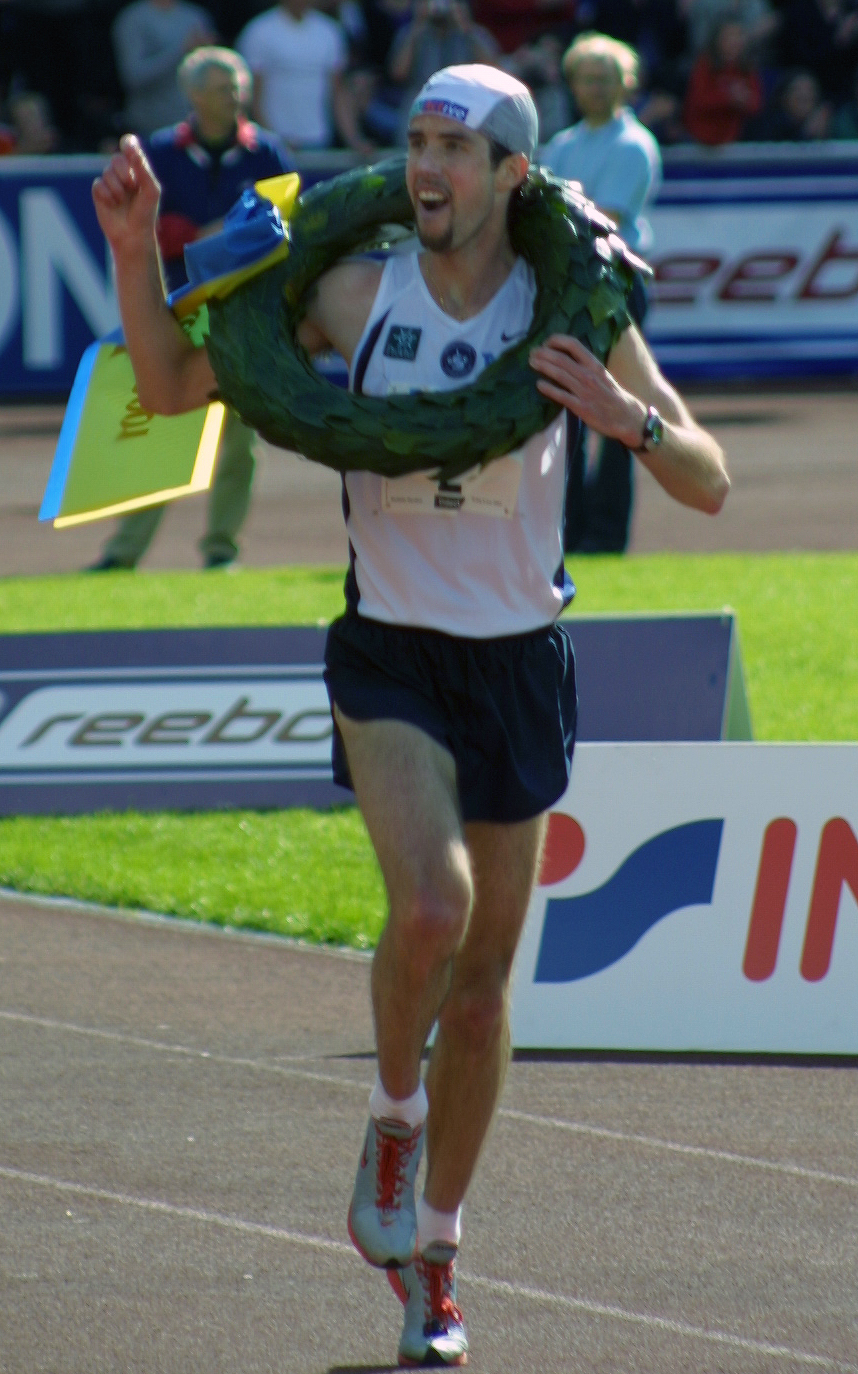
Szalkai wins 2001 Stockholm Marathon race

== Achievements ==
Year	Competition	Venue	Position	Event	Notes
Representing Sweden
1994	European Championships	Helsinki, Finland	46th	Marathon	2:21:42
1996	Olympic Games	Atlanta, United States	64th	Marathon	2:24:27
1998	European Championships	Budapest, Hungary	25th	Marathon	2:17:40
1999	World Championships	Seville, Spain	32nd	Marathon	2:23:18
2001	Stockholm Marathon	Stockholm, Sweden	1st	Marathon	2:18:17
2001	World Championships	Edmonton, Canada	39th	Marathon	2:28:33
