= Mark Plaatjes =

American long-distance runner

Personal information
- Born: 2 June 1962 (age 64) Johannesburg, South Africa
Medal record
Men's athletics
Representing United States
World Championships
| Gold medal – first place | 1993 Stuttgart | Marathon |

Mark Plaatjes (born 2 June 1962 in Johannesburg) is a former marathon runner who was champion at the 1993 World Championships in Athletics in Stuttgart.

== Biography ==
Born in South Africa under apartheid, Plaatjes won two national titles at the marathon and two at cross country . He ran a personal best marathon of 2:08:58 in 1985 in Port Elizabeth, but was unable to compete outside South Africa, barred from the 1984 and 1988 Olympic Games due to the international boycott of South Africa. He sought political asylum in the United States in 1988, saying "I didn't want my daughter to grow up in a country where she felt inferior."

In 1991 Plaatjes won the Los Angeles Marathon in 2:10:29.

In 1993, Plaatjes finished 6th in the Boston Marathon, qualifying for the U.S. team at the World Championships. On 24 July 1993, Plaatjes became a citizen of the U.S., just three weeks before the World Championships. Stuttgart was to be the greatest success of his career. The race had been led by Luketz Swartbooi from Namibia for a very long time. At 40 km, Swartbooi still looked like the likely winner. But the Namibian slowed down in the very final stages and was overtaken by Plaatjes three minutes before he reached the finish line, in a time of 2:13:57. Plaatjes became the first American to win a gold medal in any long-distance event at the World Championships.

Plaatjes has made his home in Boulder, Colorado, where he has a hand in several local businesses and coaches a local running club.

== Achievements ==
- All results regarding marathon, unless stated otherwise

| Year | Competition | Venue | Position | Notes |
Representing the United States
| 1993 | World Championships | Stuttgart, Germany | 1st | 2:13:57 |
