= Aleksey Zhelonkin =

Russian long-distance runner

Aleksey Zhelonkin (born 21 January 1966) is a former, Russian, male long-distance runner who competed in marathons. He ran at two major international events, placing eighth at the 1993 World Championships in Athletics and failing to finish at the 1994 European Athletics Championships.

He completed over 20 marathons, but only finished in the top three once – at the 1996 Siberian International Marathon. He set a lifetime best of 2:10:44 hours when he placed sixth at the Fukuoka Marathon. He had top ten finishes at the Paris Marathon, Beijing Marathon, Sydney Marathon, Hannover Marathon and Belgrade Marathon.

== International competitions ==
Year	Competition	Venue	Position	Event	Notes
1993	World Championships	Stuttgart, Germany	8th	Marathon	2:18:52
1994	European Championships	Helsinki, Finland	—	Marathon	DNF
