= Diego García (runner) =

Spanish long-distance runner

Medal record

Men's athletics

Representing Spain

European Championships
Silver medal – second place	1994 Helsinki	Marathon

Diego García Corrales (October 12, 1961 – March 31, 2001) was a Spanish long-distance athlete from Spain, who finished in 9th place (2:14.56) in the men's marathon at the 1992 Summer Olympics in Barcelona, Spain. Four years later, when Atlanta, United States hosted The Games, he ended up in 53rd place, clocking 2:22:11. He was born in Azkoitia, Gipuzkoa and died in Azpeitia.

Diego García died of sudden cardiac death during a training run at the age of 39. A statue was erected, and The Azkoitia-Azpeitia Half Marathon was renamed to Diego Garcia Memorial in his honour.

== Achievements ==
Year	Competition	Venue	Position	Event	Notes
Representing Spain
1991	World Championships	Tokyo, Japan	14th	Marathon	2:21:16
1992	Olympic Games	Barcelona, Spain	9th	Marathon	2:14:56
1994	European Championships	Helsinki, Finland	2nd	Marathon	2:10:46
1995	World Championships	Gothenburg, Sweden	6th	Marathon	2:15:34
1996	Olympic Games	Atlanta, United States	53rd	Marathon	2:22:11
1997	World Championships	Athens, Greece	—	Marathon	DNF
1998	European Championships	Budapest, Hungary	—	Marathon	DNF
