= Luis Soares =

French-Portuguese long-distance runner (1964–2024)

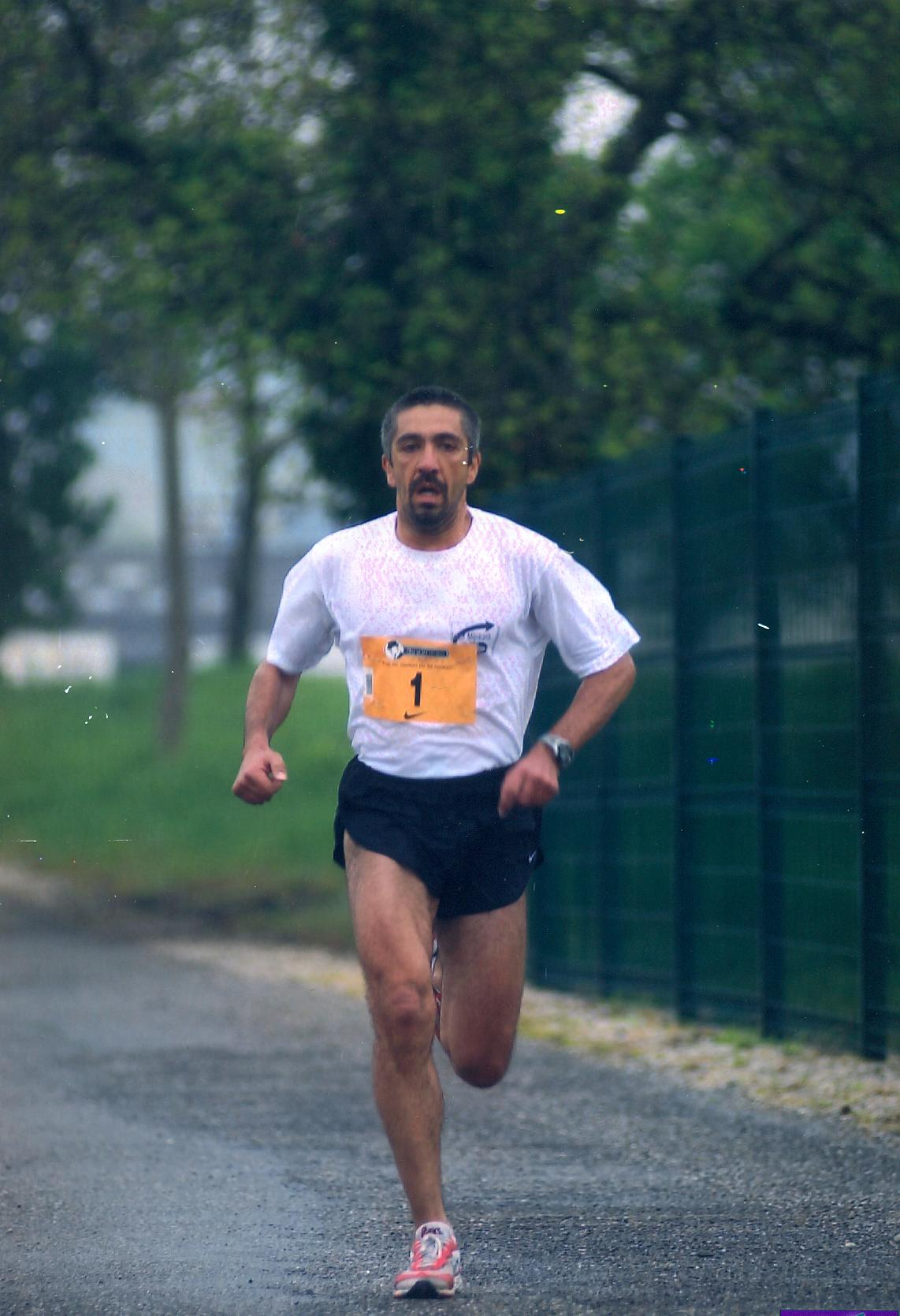
Luis Soares

Luis Soares (24 March 1964 – 13 November 2024) was a Portuguese-French long-distance runner. Born in Nazaré, he started to run for his birth country, before settling in France in 1986 and being naturalized French in 1989.

On 29 March 1992, he won the Paris Marathon with a personal best of 2:10:03, setting a new French national record which stood until 1998. He represented France at the 1992 Summer Olympics in Barcelona, Spain, finishing 45th in the marathon. He also ran the marathon for France at the 1999 World Athletics Championships but did not finish the race.

Soares died on 13 November 2024, at the age of 60, after a long illness.

== Achievements ==
- All results regarding marathon, unless stated otherwise

Year	Competition	Venue	Position	Notes
Representing France
1987	Lille Marathon	Lille, France	1st	2:14:41
1992	Paris Marathon	Paris, France	1st	2:10:03
1992	Olympic Games	Barcelona, Spain	45th	2:21:57
1999	World Championships	Seville, Spain	—	DNF

== Sources ==
- Evans, Hilary; Gjerde, Arild; Heijmans, Jeroen; Mallon, Bill; et al. "Luis Soares". Olympics at Sports-Reference.com. Sports Reference LLC. Archived from the original on 17 April 2020.
