= Alfred Shemweta =

Swedish long-distance runner

Alfred Shemweta (born February 19, 1970, in Lushoto, Tanzania) is a male long-distance runner who competed internationally for Sweden. He twice won the Stockholm Marathon during his career: 1999 and 2000. Shemweta set his personal best time of 2:14:52 in the men's marathon on June 12, 1999, as part of his winning run at the Stockholm Marathon.

He was selected to represent Sweden at the 1999 World Championships in Athletics and he finished 28th in the men's marathon race. Shemweta retained his title at the Stockholm Marathon the following year.

== Achievements ==
Year	Competition	Venue	Position	Event	Notes
Representing Sweden
1999	Stockholm Marathon	Stockholm, Sweden	1st	Marathon	2:14:52
1999	World Championships	Seville, Spain	28th	Marathon	2:20:27
2000	Stockholm Marathon	Stockholm, Sweden	1st	Marathon	2:18:49
