= Alexander Mutiso Munyao =

Kenyan long-distance runner

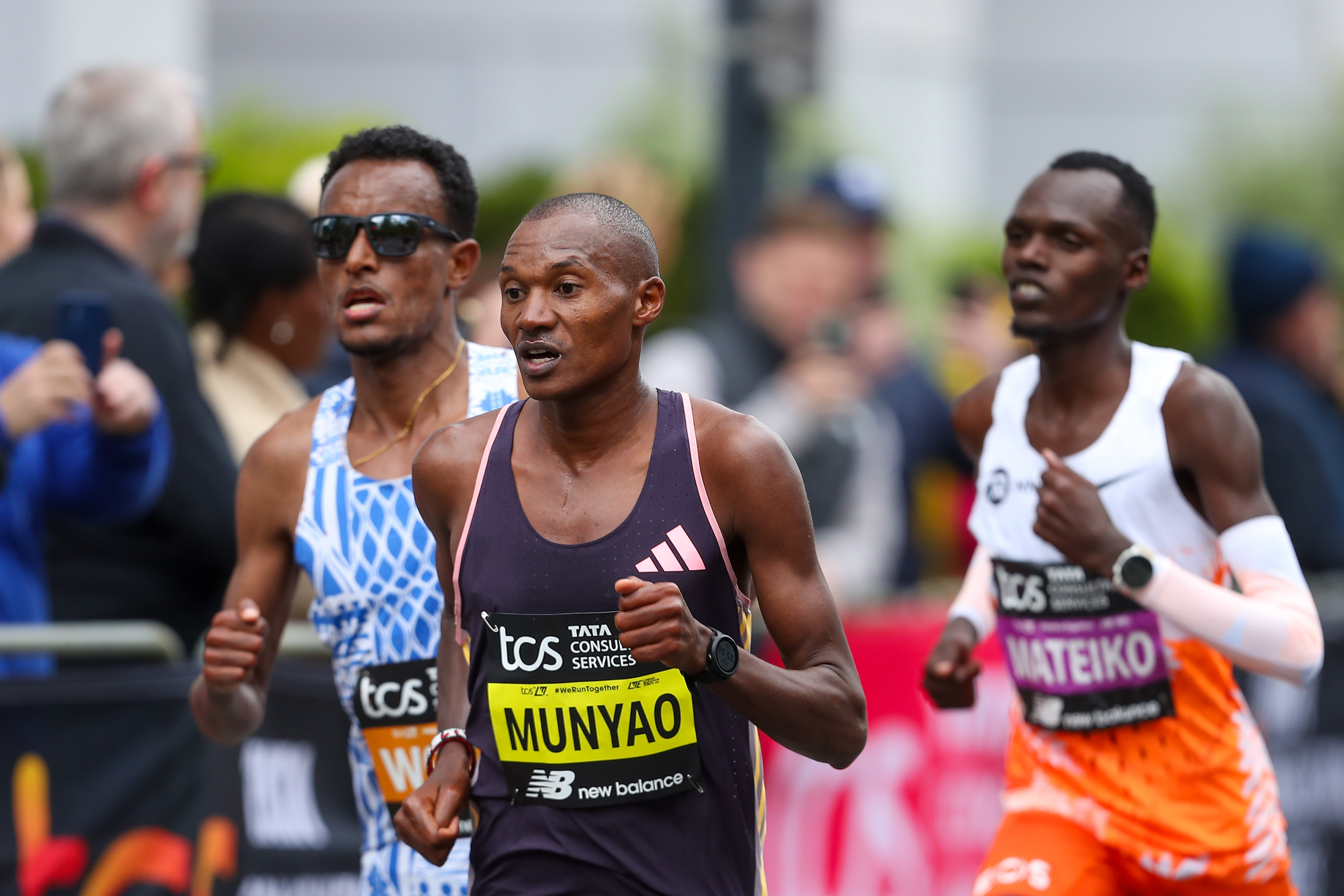

Personal information
- Born: 10 September 1996 (age 29) Kiteta, Makueni County, Kenya

Sport
- Country: Kenya
- Sport: Athletics
- Event: Long-distance running
- Coached by: Peter Muteti
Medal record
Men's Athletics
Representing Kenya
World Youth Championships
Bronze medal – third place	2013 Donetsk	3000 m
World Marathon Majors
Gold medal – first place	2024 London	Marathon
Silver medal – second place	2025 New York	Marathon
Bronze medal – third place	2025 London	Marathon
Bronze medal – third place	2026 Tokyo	Marathon

Alexander Mutiso Munyao (born 10 September 1996) is a Kenyan long-distance runner who specializes in road running.

His personal best of 57:59 in the half marathon set at the 2020 Valencia Half Marathon is the fourth fastest time ever. He also won 2023 Prague International Marathon at the course record of 2:05:09.

In the 2024 London Marathon, Munyao pulled away from legendary Ethiopian distance runner Kenenisa Bekele in the final three kilometers to win the race in 2:04:01.

== Personal bests ==
Outdoor

- 3000 metres – 7:56.86 (Donetsk 2013)
- 5000 metres – 13:21.90 (Kumamoto 2016)
- 10,000 metres – 27:23.03 (Yokohama 2021)

Road

- Half marathon – 57:59 (Valencia 2020)
- Marathon - 2:03:11 (Valencia 2023)
