= Athletics at the 1996 Summer Olympics – Men's marathon =

Men's marathon at the Games of the XXVI Olympiad
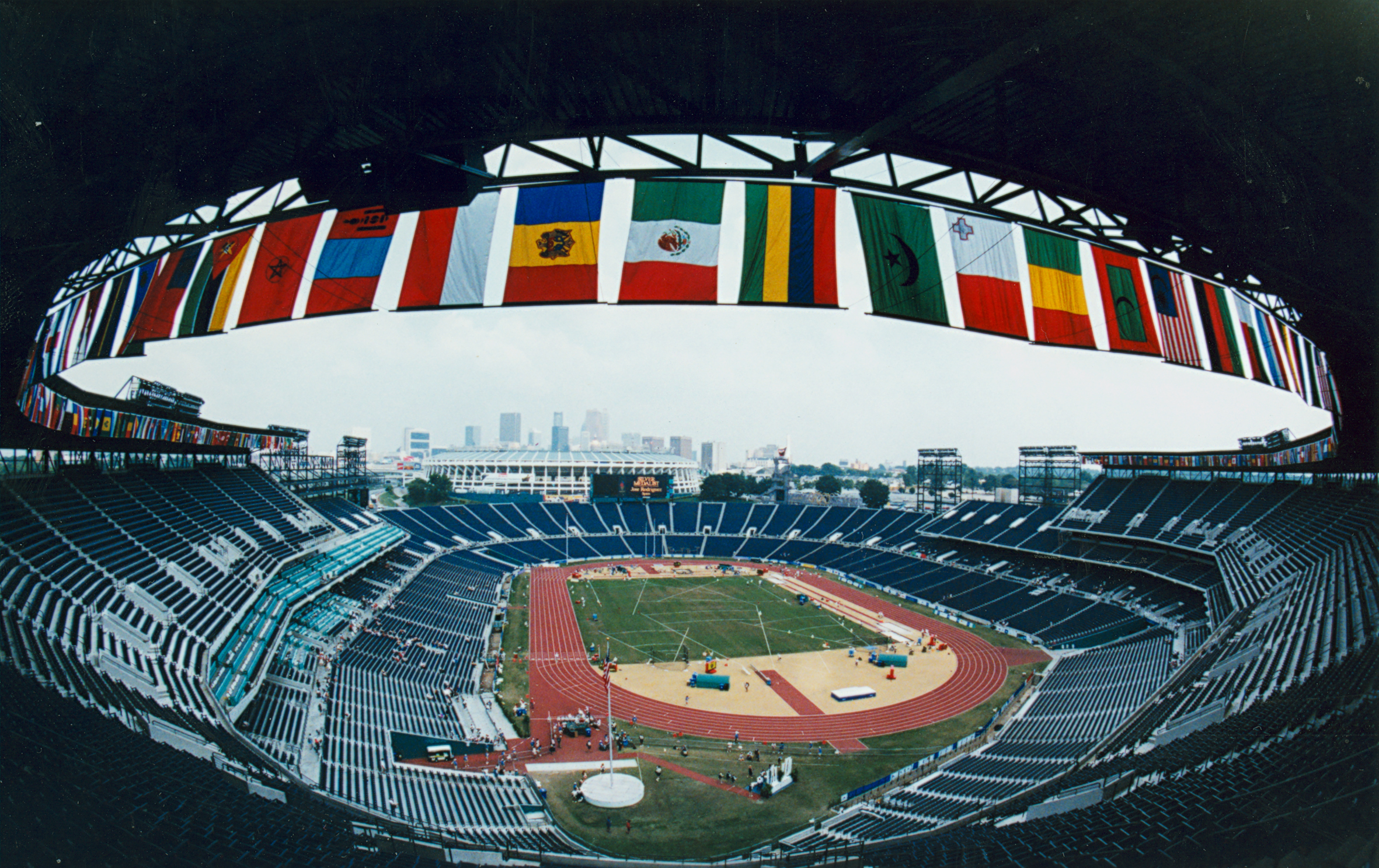
- Centennial Olympic Stadium (during the 1996 Paralympic Games)
- Venue: Centennial Olympic Stadium, Atlanta
- Date: August 4
- Competitors: 124 from 79 nations
- Winning time: 2:12:36

Medalists
| 1st place, gold medalist(s) | | Josia Thugwane; South Africa |
| 2nd place, silver medalist(s) | | Lee Bong-Ju; South Korea |
| 3rd place, bronze medalist(s) | | Erick Wainaina; Kenya |

Official Video Highlights

The men's marathon at the 1996 Summer Olympics in Atlanta was held on Sunday, August 4, 1996. The race started at 07:05h local time to avoid excessively hot and humid conditions. A total number of 111 athletes completed the race, with an injured and limping Abdul Baser Wasiqi from Afghanistan finishing in last position in 4:24:17.

There were 124 competitors from 79 countries. The maximum number of athletes per nation had been set at 3 since the 1930 Olympic Congress. Thirteen competitors did not finish. The medal ceremony took place during the Closing Ceremony which they did again in Athens eight years later. The event was won by Josia Thugwane of South Africa, the nation's first victory in the Olympic men's marathon since 1912. South Korea's Lee Bong-ju won the silver, and Erick Wainaina of Kenya won bronze.

== Summary ==
There were few favorites in the event. The race started at an Olympic stadium and after 3 1/2 laps of the track they started on the out and back course through Atlanta. There was a large group of about 60 in front. It was not until mile 15 that things started to get stirred up. The South Africans made a wall at the front and proceeded to increase the pace. They were joined by Lee Bong-Ju. The race continued as such until mile 17. Josia Thugwane made a move and was joined by Lee Bong-Ju. Meanwhile, Erick Wainaina joined the two in front. The three switched leads several times until Thugwane made a move outside Olympic stadium. He took through the tunnel while Lee Bong-Ju passed Wainaina. It was the closest finish in Olympic history but Thugwane maintained his lead in the last mile to take the gold medal in 2:12:36. Lee Bong-Ju took silver and Wainaina bronze.

== Background ==
This was the 23rd appearance of the event, which is one of 12 athletics events to have been held at every Summer Olympics. Returning runners from the 1992 marathon included bronze medalist Stephan Freigang of Germany, fifth-place finisher Salvatore Bettiol of Italy, eighth-place finisher Hiromi Taniguchi of Japan, and ninth-place finisher Diego García of Spain. Martín Fiz of Spain was the reigning World and European champion. Belayneh Dinsamo of Ethiopia was the world record holder, but that record had been set 8 years previously. As in 1992, there was "no dominant male marathoner entering the 1996 Olympics and the race was considered wide-open."

Afghanistan, Andorra, Bosnia and Herzegovina, Burundi, Cambodia, Cape Verde, Indonesia, Kyrgyzstan, Lithuania, Mauritius, Moldova, Saint Vincent and the Grenadines, Trinidad and Tobago, Ukraine, Venezuela, and Yemen each made their first appearance in Olympic men's marathons. The United States made its 22nd appearance, most of any nation, having missed only the boycotted 1980 Games.

== Competition format and course ==
As all Olympic marathons, the competition was a single race. The marathon distance of 26 miles, 385 yards was run over an out-and-back route starting and finishing at the Olympic Stadium. The course generally followed that used by the Atlanta Marathon at the time, with most of the route along Piedmont Road and Peachtree Street. Landmarks along the course included the Georgia State Capitol, Ebenezer Baptist Church, and Oglethorpe University (the U-turn in the middle of the out-and-back route).

== Records ==
These were the standing world and Olympic records prior to the 1996 Summer Olympics.

| World record | Belayneh Dinsamo (ETH) | 2:06:50 | Rotterdam, Netherlands | 17 April 1988 |
| Olympic record | Carlos Lopes (POR) | 2:09:21 | Los Angeles, United States | 12 August 1984 |

No new world or Olympic bests were set during the competition. The following national records were established during the competition:

| Nation | Athlete | Round | Time |
|---|---|---|---|
| Yemen | Mohamed Al-Saadi | Final | 2:40:41 |

== Schedule ==
The Olympic marathon, usually scheduled for afternoons or evenings at the Games' last day, began early in the morning in 1996 due to the anticipated heat and humidity of summer in Atlanta. The temperature by about 10 a.m. local time, as runners finished, was approximately 80 °F (27 °C) with 80% humidity.

All times are Eastern Daylight Time (UTC−4)

| Date | Time | Round |
|---|---|---|
| Sunday, 4 August 1996 | 7:05 | Final |

== Results ==
| Rank | Athlete | Nation | Time | Notes |
|---|---|---|---|---|
| 1st place, gold medalist(s) | Josia Thugwane | South Africa | 2:12:36 | |
| 2nd place, silver medalist(s) | Lee Bong-ju | South Korea | 2:12:39 | |
| 3rd place, bronze medalist(s) | Erick Wainaina | Kenya | 2:12:44 | |
| 4 | Martín Fiz | Spain | 2:13:20 | |
| 5 | Richard Nerurkar | Great Britain | 2:13:39 | |
| 6 | Germán Silva | Mexico | 2:14:29 | |
| 7 | Steve Moneghetti | Australia | 2:14:35 | |
| 8 | Benjamín Paredes | Mexico | 2:14:55 | |
| 9 | Danilo Goffi | Italy | 2:15:08 | |
| 10 | Luíz Antônio dos Santos | Brazil | 2:15:55 | |
| 11 | Carlos Grisales | Colombia | 2:15:56 | |
| 12 | Kim Yi-Yong | South Korea | 2:16:17 | |
| 13 | Tendai Chimusasa | Zimbabwe | 2:16:31 | |
| 14 | António Pinto | Portugal | 2:16:41 | |
| 15 | Dionicio Cerón | Mexico | 2:16:48 | |
| 16 | Mwenze Kalombo | Zaire | 2:17:01 | |
| 17 | Leszek Bebło | Poland | 2:17:04 | |
| 18 | Alberto Juzdado | Spain | 2:17:24 | |
| 19 | Hiromi Taniguchi | Japan | 2:17:26 | |
| 20 | Salvatore Bettiol | Italy | 2:17:27 | |
| 21 | Peter Fonseca | Canada | 2:17:28 | |
| 22 | Rolando Vera | Ecuador | 2:17:40 | |
| 23 | Roderic De Highden | Australia | 2:17:42 | |
| 24 | José Luis Molina | Costa Rica | 2:17:49 | |
| 25 | Domingos Castro | Portugal | 2:18:03 | |
| 26 | Tahar Mansouri | Tunisia | 2:18:06 | |
| 27 | Lawrence Peu | South Africa | 2:18:09 | |
| 28 | Keith Brantly | United States | 2:18:17 | |
| 29 | Thabisio Ralekhetla | Lesotho | 2:18:26 | |
| 30 | Khristo Stefanov | Bulgaria | 2:18:29 | |
| 31 | Bob Kempainen | United States | 2:18:38 | |
| 32 | Harri Hänninen | Finland | 2:18:41 | |
| 33 | Gert Thys | South Africa | 2:18:55 | |
| 34 | Sean Quilty | Australia | 2:19:35 | |
| 35 | Carey Nelson | Canada | 2:19:39 | |
| 36 | Spyros Andriopoulos | Greece | 2:19:41 | |
| 37 | Oleg Strizhakov | Russia | 2:19:51 | |
| 38 | Kim Jung-won | North Korea | 2:19:54 | |
| 39 | Bruce Deacon | Canada | 2:19:56 | |
| 40 | Kim Jong-su | North Korea | 2:20:19 | |
| 41 | Mark Coogan | United States | 2:20:27 | |
| 42 | Hussein Ahmed Salah | Djibouti | 2:20:33 | |
| 43 | Petro Sarafyniuk | Ukraine | 2:20:37 | |
| 44 | Abdelkader El Mouaziz | Morocco | 2:20:39 | |
| 45 | Bert van Vlaanderen | Netherlands | 2:20:48 | |
| 46 | Manuel Matias | Portugal | 2:20:58 | |
| 47 | Vanderlei de Lima | Brazil | 2:21:01 | |
| 48 | Konrad Dobler | Germany | 2:21:12 | |
| 49 | Borislav Dević | FR Yugoslavia | 2:21:22 | |
| 50 | Davide Milesi | Italy | 2:21:45 | |
| 51 | Aleksandrs Prokopčuks | Latvia | 2:21:50 | |
| 52 | Lameck Aguta | Kenya | 2:22:04 | |
| 53 | Diego García | Spain | 2:22:11 | |
| 54 | Masaki Oya | Japan | 2:22:13 | |
| 55 | Peter Whitehead | Great Britain | 2:22:37 | |
| 56 | Ezequiel Bitok | Kenya | 2:23:03 | |
| 57 | Hsu Gi-sheng | Chinese Taipei | 2:23:04 | |
| 58 | Pavel Loskutov | Estonia | 2:23:14 | |
| 59 | Rubén Maza | Venezuela | 2:23:24 | |
| 60 | Steve Brace | Great Britain | 2:23:28 | |
| 61 | Grzegorz Gajdus | Poland | 2:23:41 | |
| 62 | Isaac Simelane | Swaziland | 2:23:43 | |
| 63 | Nazirdin Alikbekov | Kyrgyzstan | 2:23:59 | |
| 64 | Anders Szalkai | Sweden | 2:24:27 | |
| 65 | John Mwathiwa | Malawi | 2:24:45 | |
| 66 | Leonid Shvetsov | Russia | 2:24:49 | |
| 67 | Eddy Hellebuyck | Belgium | 2:25:04 | |
| 68 | Ahmed Adam Salah | Sudan | 2:25:12 | |
| 69 | Ikaji Salum | Tanzania | 2:25:29 | |
| 70 | Pavelas Fedorenka | Lithuania | 2:25:41 | |
| 71 | Miguel Mallqui | Peru | 2:25:56 | |
| 72 | Ethel Hudzon | Indonesia | 2:26:02 | |
| 73 | Diamantino dos Santos | Brazil | 2:26:53 | |
| 74 | Tika Bahadur Bogate | Nepal | 2:27:04 | |
| 75 | Ronnie Holassie | Trinidad and Tobago | 2:27:20 | |
| 76 | Joseph Tjitunga | Namibia | 2:27:52 | |
| 77 | Valeriu Vlas | Moldova | 2:28:36 | |
| 78 | Daniel Sibandze | Swaziland | 2:28:49 | |
| 79 | Waldemar Cotelo | Uruguay | 2:28:50 | |
| 80 | Petko Stefanov | Bulgaria | 2:29:06 | |
| 81 | Abebe Mekonnen | Ethiopia | 2:29:45 | |
| 82 | Luis Martínez | Guatemala | 2:29:55 | |
| 83 | Sean Wade | New Zealand | 2:30:35 | |
| 84 | Abderrahim Ben Redouane | Morocco | 2:30:49 | |
| 85 | Abdou Monzo | Niger | 2:30:57 | |
| 86 | Marcelo Barrientos | Chile | 2:31:05 | |
| 87 | Antoni Bernardo | Andorra | 2:31:28 | |
| 88 | Adel Adili | Libya | 2:32:12 | |
| 89 | Carlos Tarazona | Venezuela | 2:32:35 | |
| 90 | Tharcisse Gashaka | Burundi | 2:32:55 | |
| 91 | Policarpio Calizaya | Bolivia | 2:33:08 | |
| 92 | Simon Qamunga | Tanzania | 2:33:11 | |
| 93 | Kenjiro Jitsui | Japan | 2:33:27 | |
| 94 | António Zeferino | Cape Verde | 2:34:13 | |
| 95 | Pamenos Ballantyne | Saint Vincent and the Grenadines | 2:34:16 | |
| 96 | Kaleka Mutoke | Zaire | 2:34:40 | |
| 97 | Ernest Ndjissipou | Central African Republic | 2:35:55 | |
| 98 | Ali Ettounsi | Morocco | 2:36:01 | |
| 99 | William Aguirre | Nicaragua | 2:37:02 | |
| 100 | Roy Vence | Philippines | 2:37:10 | |
| 101 | Mohamed Al-Saadi | Yemen | 2:40:41 | NR |
| 102 | Julio Hernández | Colombia | 2:41:56 | |
| 103 | Ajay Chuttoo | Mauritius | 2:42:07 | |
| 104 | Nils Antonio | Jamaica | 2:44:10 | |
| 105 | To Rithya | Cambodia | 2:47:10 | |
| 106 | Maximo Oliveras | Puerto Rico | 2:47:15 | |
| 107 | Islam Ðugum | Bosnia and Herzegovina | 2:47:38 | |
| 108 | Marlon Selwyn Williams | Virgin Islands | 2:48:26 | |
| 109 | Eugene Muslar | Belize | 2:51:41 | |
| 110 | Abdi Isak | Somalia | 2:59:55 | |
| 111 | Abdel Baser Wasiqi | Afghanistan | 4:24:17 | |
| — | Belayneh Dinsamo | Ethiopia | DNF | |
| — | Stephan Freigang | Germany | DNF | |
| — | Patrick Ishyaka | Rwanda | DNF | |
| — | Benjamin Keleketu | Botswana | DNF | |
| — | Kim Wan-Ki | South Korea | DNF | |
| — | Česlovas Kundrotas | Lithuania | DNF | |
| — | Omar Moussa | Djibouti | DNF | |
| — | Victor Razafindrakoto | Madagascar | DNF | |
| — | Antonio Silio | Argentina | DNF | |
| — | Julius Sumaye | Tanzania | DNF | |
| — | Tumo Turbo | Ethiopia | DNF | |
| — | Risto Ulmala | Finland | DNF | |
| — | Dainius Virbickas | Lithuania | DNF | |

== See also ==
- 1995 Men's World Championships Marathon
- 1997 Men's World Championships Marathon
