= Stockholm Marathon =

Annual marathon in Stockholm, Sweden

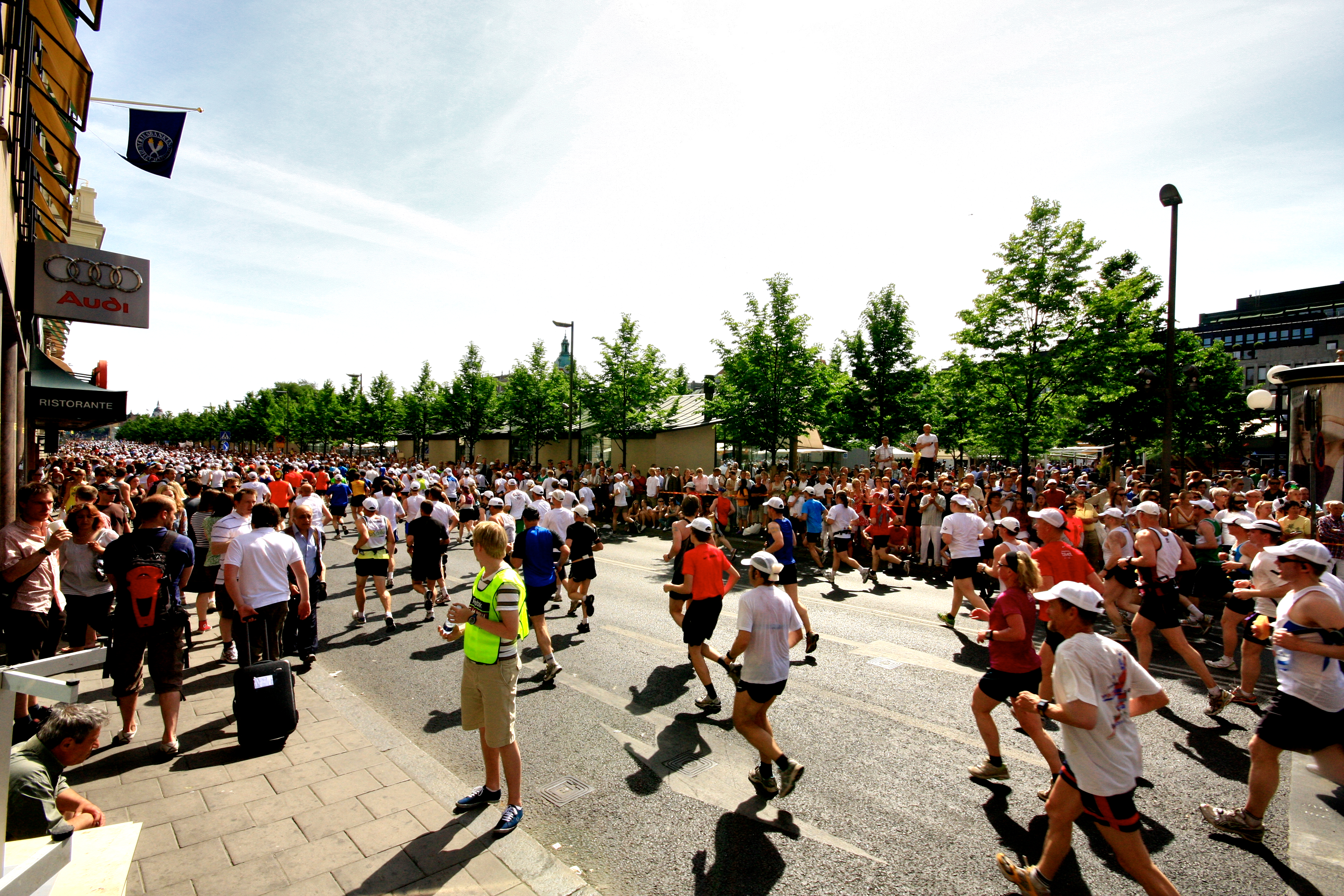
- Runners in the 2008 race
- Date: June
- Location: Stockholm, Sweden
- Event type: road
- Distance: Marathon
- Primary sponsor: adidas
- Established: 1979
- Course records: Men's: 2:10:10 (2019) (Ethiopia) Nigussie Sahlesilassie; Women's: 2:28:24 (1988) (Norway) Grete Waitz
- Website: Stockholm Marathon
- Participants: 6,958 finishers (2021); 12,349 (2019)

The Stockholm Marathon, known as the adidas Stockholm Marathon for sponsorship reasons, is an annual marathon arranged in Stockholm, Sweden, since 1979. It serves as the Swedish marathon championship race. More than 20 000 runners ran in the 2026 Stockholm Marathon, with around 19 000 finishing. The marathon is categorized as a Bronze Label Road Race by World Athletics.

== Course ==
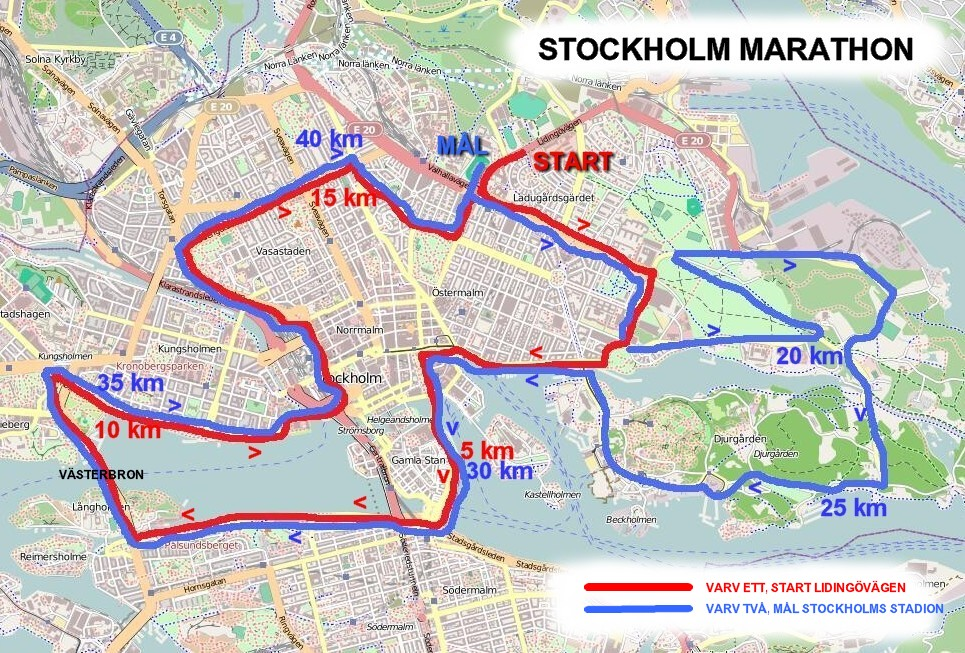
Course from 2010 onwards

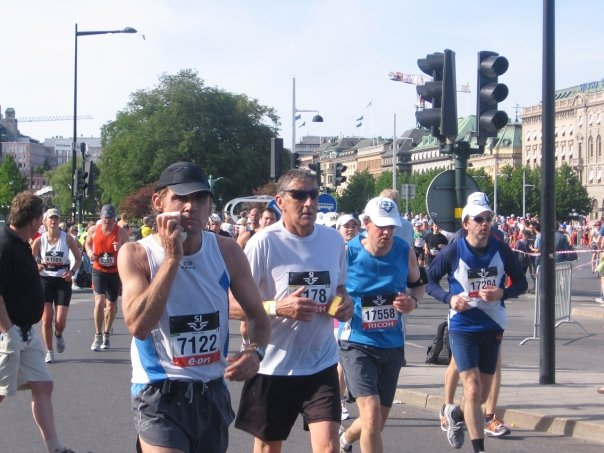
Near the Royal Palace in 2008

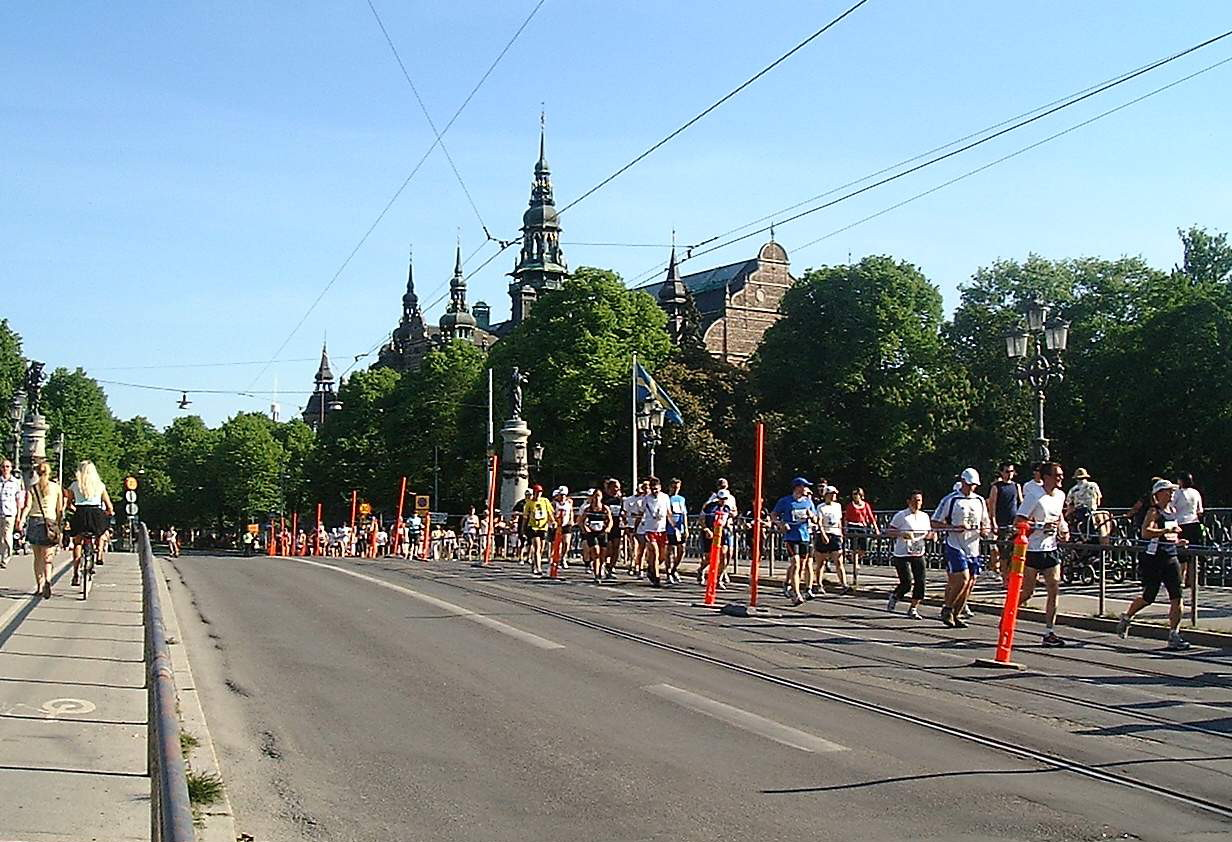
On the bridge Djurgårdsbron in 2007

The marathon starts adjacent to the 1912 Olympic Stadium and consists of two loops around the city, finishing with a three-quarter lap around the tracks of the Olympic Stadium. Until and including the 2009 edition, the two loops around the city differed only slightly from each other, but the major part of the loops were identical. However, from 2010 the route was changed somewhat to make the loops more different from each other. Most notably, the first loop is now shorter, thus minimizing the number of trailing runners that the elite runners have to lap.

== Date ==
The marathon normally takes place at the end of May or the beginning of June. It is held on a Saturday afternoon, thus distinguishing it from the majority of city marathons (London, New York, Paris) which take place on Sunday mornings, to minimise disruption to the city. This leads to a risk in some editions being held in considerable heat, and indeed has been, as with the 2018 marathon where temperatures reached around 30 °C (86 °F) in certain areas.

The 2020 edition of the race was cancelled due to the coronavirus pandemic. (Note: The 2020 edition was initially postponed to 5 September 2020 but eventually ended up cancelled, with all registrants having the option of transferring their bib to another runner, and foreign runners also having the option of transferring their registration to 2021.) The 2021 competition was postponed as well, and ended up held on Saturday, 9 October.

== Reception ==
The book The Ultimate Guide to International Marathons ranks the Stockholm Marathon as the best marathon in the world.

== Winners ==
In the case of Swedish runners, the runner's club is also mentioned.
Key: Course record

=== Men ===
Year	Athlete	Country	Time
1979	Jukka Toivola	Finland	2:17:35
1980	Jeff Wells	United States	2:15:49
1981	Bill Rodgers	United States	2:13:26
1982	Kjell-Erik Ståhl	Sweden - Hässleholms AIS	2:19:20
1983	Hugh Jones	United Kingdom	2:11:37
1984	Agapius Masong	Tanzania	2:13:47
1985	Tommy Persson	Sweden - Heleneholms IF	2:17:18
1986	Kjell-Erik Ståhl	Sweden - Enhörna IF	2:12:33
1987	Kevin Forster	United Kingdom	2:13:52
1988	Suleiman Nyambui	Tanzania	2:14:26
1989	Dave Clarke	United Kingdom	2:13:34
1990	Simon Naali	Tanzania	2:13:04
1991	Åke Eriksson	Sweden - Hässelby SK	2:12:38
1992	Hugh Jones	United Kingdom	2:15:58
1993	Daniel Mbuli	South Africa	2:16:30
1994	Tesfaye Bekele	Ethiopia	2:14:06
1995	Åke Eriksson	Sweden - Hässelby SK	2:14:29
1996	Tesfaye Bekele	Ethiopia	2:15:05
1997	Benson Masya	Kenya	2:17:22
1998	Martin Ojuko	Kenya	2:16:12
1999	Alfred Shemweta	Sweden - Flemingsbergs SK	2:14:52
2000	Alfred Shemweta	Sweden - Flemingsbergs SK	2:18:49
2001	Anders Szalkai	Sweden - Spårvägens FK	2:18:17
2002	Mytahar Echchadi	Morocco	2:18:20
2003	Josphat Chemjor	Kenya	2:18:14
2004	Joseph Riri	Kenya	2:16:12
2005	Kasirayi Sita	Zimbabwe	2:13:28
2006	Philipp Bandawe	Zimbabwe	2:17:01
2007	Philipp Bandawe	Zimbabwe	2:20:56
2008	Willy Korir	Kenya	2:16:03
2009	Paul Kogo	Kenya	2:15:34
2010	Joseph Lagat	Kenya	2:12:48
2011	Shume Gerbaba	Ethiopia	2:14:07
2012	Methkal Abu Drais	Jordan	2:19:16
2013	Shume Gerbaba	Ethiopia	2:16:13
2014	Benjamin Bitok	Kenya	2:13:21
2015	Yekeber Bayabel	Ethiopia	2:18:22
2016	Stanley Koech	Kenya	2:10:58
2017	Abrha Milaw	Ethiopia	2:11:36
2018	Lawi Kiptui	Kenya	2:13:30
2019	Nigussie Sahlesilassie	Ethiopia	2:10:10
2020	cancelled due to coronavirus pandemic		
2021	Fikadu Teferi	Ethiopia	2:12:23
2022	Felix Kirwa	Kenya	2:11:08
2023	Ashenafi Moges	Ethiopia	2:10:32
2024	Fredrick Kibii	Kenya	2:14:17
2025	Onemus Kiplagat Kiplimo	Kenya	2:11:34
2026	Edwin Kiptoo	Kenya	2:10:46

=== Women ===
Year	Athlete	Country	Time
1979	Heide Brenner	West Germany	2:47:06
1980	Ingrid Kristiansen	Norway	2:38:45
1981	Ingrid Kristiansen	Norway	2:41:34
1982	Ingrid Kristiansen	Norway	2:34:26
1983	Tuulikki Räisänen	Sweden - Enhörna IF	2:36:58
1984	Ria Van Landeghem	Belgium	2:34:13
1985	Jeanette Nordgren	Sweden - IK Vikingen	2:36:43
1986	Evy Palm	Sweden - Mölndals AIK	2:34:42
1987	Evy Palm	Sweden - Mölndals AIK	2:35:14
1988	Grete Waitz	Norway	2:28:24
1989	Evy Palm	Sweden - Mölndals AIK	2:33:26
1990	Midde Hamrin	Sweden - Mölndals AIK	2:37:07
1991	Midde Hamrin	Sweden - Mölndals AIK	2:36:15
1992	Linda Milo	Belgium	2:39:10
1993	Grete Kirkeberg	Norway	2:37:58
1994	Irina Sklarenko	Ukraine	2:40:34
1995	Ingmarie Nilsson	Sweden - Ullevi Friidrott	2:33:03
1996	Grete Kirkeberg	Norway	2:36:40
1997	Anita Håkenstad	Norway	2:33:26
1998	Grete Kirkeberg	Norway	2:37:39
1999	Marie Söderström-Lundberg	Sweden - Hässelby SK	2:36:55
2000	Marie Söderström-Lundberg	Sweden - Hässelby SK	2:37:57
2001	Esther Kiplagat	Kenya	2:29:55
2002	Lena Gavelin	Sweden - BIF Jamtrennarna	2:33:48
2003	Marie Söderström-Lundberg	Sweden - Hässelby SK	2:35:07
2004	Rita Jeptoo	Kenya	2:35:14
2005	Tina María Ramos	Spain	2:41:31
2006	Anna Rahm	Sweden - Rånäs	2:36:35
2007	Kirsten Otterbu	Norway	2:37:02
2008	Isabellah Andersson	Sweden - Hässelby SK	2:34:14
2009	Isabellah Andersson	Sweden - Hässelby SK	2:33:52
2010	Isabellah Andersson	Sweden - Hässelby SK	2:31:35
2011	Isabellah Andersson	Sweden - Hässelby SK	2:37:28
2012	Derebe Godana	Ethiopia	2:40:19
2013	Isabellah Andersson	Sweden - Hässelby SK	2:33:49
2014	Isabellah Andersson	Sweden - Hässelby SK	2:32:28
2015	Isabellah Andersson	Sweden - Hässelby SK	2:34:14
2016	Jane Onyangi	Kenya	2:31:45
2017	Konjit Tilahun	Ethiopia	2:35:45
2018	Mikaela Larsson	Sweden	2:40:28
2019	Aberash Fayesa	Ethiopia	2:33:38
2020	cancelled due to coronavirus pandemic		
2021	Atalel Anmut	Ethiopia	2:29:03
2022	Tsige Haileslase	Ethiopia	2:31:48
2023	Sifan Melaku	Ethiopia	2:30:44
2024	Marion Kibor	Kenya	2:31:46
2025	Shewarge Alene	Ethiopia	2:30:38
2026	Rebeca Chesir	Kenya	2:30:58
