= 1998 European Athletics Championships – Men's 10,000 metres =

European Sports Championship

Men's 10,000 metres at the European Athletics Championships

The men's 10,000 metres at the 1998 European Athletics Championships was held at the Népstadion on 18 August.

== Medalists ==
Gold	António Pinto; Portugal
Silver	Dieter Baumann; Germany
Bronze	Stéphane Franke; Germany

== Results ==
KEY:	q	Fastest non-qualifiers	Q	Qualified	NR	National record	PB	Personal best	SB	Seasonal best

=== Final ===
Rank	Name	Nationality	Time	Notes
1st place, gold medalist(s)	António Pinto	Portugal	27:48.62	
2nd place, silver medalist(s)	Dieter Baumann	Germany	27:56.75	
3rd place, bronze medalist(s)	Stéphane Franke	Germany	27:59.90	
4	Jon Brown	Great Britain	28:02.33	
5	Bruno Toledo	Spain	28:15.17	
6	Enrique Molina	Spain	28:19.54	
7	Rachid Berradi	Italy	28:22.31	
8	Kamiel Maase	Netherlands	28:26.37	
9	Carsten Jørgensen	Denmark	28:31.44	
10	Róbert Štefko	Slovakia	28:31.59	
11	Keith Cullen	Great Britain	28:34.34	
12	Simone Zanon	Italy	28:43.23	
13	Metin Sazak	Turkey	28:48.66	
14	Paulo Guerra	Portugal	28:52.66	
15	Michael Thomas	France	29:01.96	
16	Zoltán Káldy	Hungary	29:09.63	SB
17	Stéphane Schweickhardt	Switzerland	29:18.42	
18	Claes Nyberg	Sweden	29:28.88	
19	Viktor Röthlin	Switzerland	29:37.53	
	Julio Rey	Spain	DNF	
	Jan Pešava	Czech Republic	DNF	
