= Tsige Haileslase =

Ethiopian long-distance runner

Personal information
- Nationality: Ethiopian
- Born: Tsige Haileslase Abreha; 21 September 2000 (age 25) Ethiopia
- Occupation: long-distance runner
- Years active: 2021–present

Sport
- Country: Ethiopia
- Sport: Athletics
- Event(s): Marathon, Half marathon, 10 km, Cross Country

Achievements and titles
- Personal bests: Marathon: 2:22:10 (2023); Half marathon: 1:08:30 (2021); 10 km: 32:03 (2018)
Medal record
Athletics
Representing Ethiopia
Gold medal – first place	2023 Sanlam Cape Town Marathon	Marathon
Gold medal – first place	2022 Stockholm Marathon	Marathon
Bronze medal – third place	2021 Campaccio Cross Country	Cross Country

Tsige Haileslase Abreha (born 21 September 2000) is an Ethiopian long-distance runner who competes in marathon, half marathon, and cross country events. She is a marathon winner of the 2023 Sanlam Cape Town Marathon and the 2022 Stockholm Marathon.

== Career ==
In 2021, Haileslase placed third at the Campaccio Cross Country event in San Giorgio su Legnano, Italy.

In 2022, Haileslase won the Stockholm Marathon in her debut at the distance, finishing in 2:31:48. She also set a personal best in the half marathon with 1:08:30 in 2021 and 10 km with 32:03 in 2018.

In 2023 she won the 2023 Sanlam Cape Town Marathon with a time of 2:24:17. This performance was an Olympic qualifying time, and she narrowly missed the course record by 15 seconds. Earlier in 2023, she set her marathon personal best of 2:22:10 at the Hamburg Marathon, finishing fourth.

In 2024, Haileslase competed in the 2024 London Marathon, where she finished 10th with a time of 2:25:03. She also placed third at the 2025 Houston Marathon, clocking 2:25:09. At the 2025 Boston Marathon, she finished 10th with a time of 2:23:43.

== Achievements ==
Year	Race	Place	Position	Time
2021	Campaccio Cross Country	San Giorgio su Legnano	3rd	Cross Country (bronze medal)
2022	Stockholm Marathon	Stockholm	1st	2:31:48
2023	Hamburg Marathon	Hamburg	4th	2:22:10 (PB)
2023	2023 Sanlam Cape Town Marathon	Cape Town	1st	2:24:17
2024	2024 London Marathon	London	10th	2:25:03
2025	Houston Marathon	Houston	3rd	2:25:09
2025	Boston Marathon	Boston	10th	2:23:43
