= 1993 World Championships in Athletics – Men's marathon =

The Men's Marathon at the 1993 World Championships in Stuttgart, Germany, was held on Saturday August 14, 1993.

== Medalists ==
Gold	Mark Plaatjes; United States (USA)
Silver	Luketz Swartbooi; Namibia (NAM)
Bronze	Bert van Vlaanderen; Netherlands (NED)

== Abbreviations ==
- All times shown are in hours:minutes:seconds

DNS	did not start
NM	no mark
WR	world record
WL	world leading
AR	area record
NR	national record
PB	personal best
SB	season best

== Records ==
Standing records prior to the 1993 World Athletics Championships
World Record	Belayneh Densamo (ETH)	2:06:50	April 17, 1988	Rotterdam, Netherlands
Event Record	Robert de Castella (AUS)	2:10:03	August 14, 1983	Helsinki, Finland
Season Best	Kim Wan-Ki (KOR)	2:09:25	March 21, 1993	Kyong-Ju, South Korea

== Final ranking ==
Rank	Athlete	Time	Note
1st place, gold medalist(s)	Mark Plaatjes (USA)	2:13:57	
2nd place, silver medalist(s)	Luketz Swartbooi (NAM)	2:14:11	
3rd place, bronze medalist(s)	Bert van Vlaanderen (NED)	2:15:12	
4	Kim Jae-ryong (KOR)	2:17:14	
5	Tadao Uchikoshi (JPN)	2:17:54	
6	Konrad Dobler (GER)	2:18:28	
7	Boniface Merande (KEN)	2:18:52	
8	Aleksey Zhelonkin (RUS)	2:18:52	
9	Tahar Mansouri (TUN)	2:18:54	
10	Peter Maher (CAN)	2:19:26	
11	Simon Robert Naali (TAN)	2:19:30	
12	Kurt Stenzel (GER)	2:19:53	
13	Steve Jones (GBR)	2:20:04	
14	Chang Ki-Shik (KOR)	2:20:40	
15	Said Ermili (MAR)	2:22:17	
16	Hitoshi Saotome (JPN)	2:22:17	
17	Elphas Ginindza (SWZ)	2:23:00	
18	Cihangir Demirel (TUR)	2:23:02	
19	Mirko Vindiš (SLO)	2:23:31	
20	Mukhamet Nazipov (RUS)	2:24:07	
21	Juma Ikangaa (TAN)	2:24:23	
22	Vladimir Kotov (BLR)	2:24:26	
23	Sid-Ali Sakhri (ALG)	2:24:35	
24	Raf Wyns (BEL)	2:25:30	
25	Dominique Chauvelier (FRA)	2:27:26	
26	Art Boileau (CAN)	2:27:30	
27	Alejandro Aros (CHI)	2:27:56	
28	Roy Dooney (IRL)	2:28:04	
29	Petr Pipa (SVK)	2:28:05	
30	Harri Hänninen (FIN)	2:28:07	
31	Igor Salamun (SLO)	2:28:56	
32	Omar Abdillahi (DJI)	2:29:28	
33	Chad Bennion (USA)	2:29:37	
34	Tena Negere (ETH)	2:29:46	
35	Martin Vrabel (SVK)	2:30:37	
36	Moses Matabane (LES)	2:30:40	
37	Hsu Gi-sheng (TPE)	2:30:56	
38	Negash Dube (ETH)	2:33:03	
39	Alberto Cuba (CUB)	2:34:26	
40	Kuruppu Karunaratne (SRI)	2:34:47	
41	Takeharu Honda (JPN)	2:37:48	
42	Mothusi Tsiana (BOT)	2:42:10	
43	Yeung Ng Fai (HKG)	2:55:17	
DID NOT FINISH (DNF)
—	Chaouki Achour (ALG)	DNF	
—	Marnix Goegebeur (BEL)	DNF	
—	Peter Fonseca (CAN)	DNF	
—	Eladio Fernandez (PAR)	DNF	
—	Roland Wille (LIE)	DNF	
—	Brad Hudson (USA)	DNF	
—	John Vermeule (NED)	DNF	
—	Stephan Freigang (GER)	DNF	
—	Abebe Mekonnen (ETH)	DNF	
—	Malcolm Norwood (AUS)	DNF	
—	Fred Schumann (GUM)	DNF	
—	Willie Mtolo (RSA)	DNF	
—	Salvatore Bettiol (ITA)	DNF	
—	Artur de Freitas (BRA)	DNF	
—	Mohamed Kamel Selmi (ALG)	DNF	
—	Carlos Patricio (POR)	DNF	
—	Thierry Constantin (SUI)	DNF	
—	Leszek Bebło (POL)	DNF	
—	Juan Torres (ESP)	DNF	
—	Paul Evans (GBR)	DNF	
—	Thomas Robert Naali (TAN)	DNF	
—	Derek Froude (NZL)	DNF	
—	Bertrand Itsweire (FRA)	DNF	
—	Sławomir Gurny (POL)	DNF	
—	Cosmas Ndeti (KEN)	DNF	
—	Joaquim Pinheiro (POR)	DNF	
DID NOT START (DNS)
—	Dave Lewis (GBR)	DNS	

== See also ==
- Men's Olympic Marathon (1992)
- 1993 Marathon Year Ranking
