= Giovanni Ruggiero =

Italian long-distance runner

Personal information
- Nationality: Italian
- Born: 19 January 1974 (age 52)

Sport
- Country: Italy
- Sport: Athletics
- Event: Long-distance running

Achievements and titles
- Personal bests: Half Marathon: 1:02:09 (1996); Marathon: 2:13:23 (2004)
Medal record
Mediterranean Games
| Silver medal – second place | 1997 Bari | Marathon |

Giovanni Ruggiero (born 19 January 1974) is an Italian male retired long-distance runner, who participated in the 1999 and 2001 World Championships in Athletics.

== Achievements ==
| Year | Competition | Venue | Position | Event | Performance | Notes |
|---|---|---|---|---|---|---|
| 1998 | European Championships | (Hungary) Budapest | 7th | Marathon | 2:13:59 | |
| 1999 | World Championships | (Spain) Sevilla | 25th | Marathon | 2:19:34 | |
| 2001 | World Championships | (Canada) Edmonton | DNF | Marathon | NM | |
