= Tadao Uchikoshi =

Japanese long-distance runner

Tadao Uchikoshi (Japanese: 打越忠夫; born 30 October 1965) is a Japanese male former long-distance runner who specialised in the marathon. Tadao represented his nation at the 1993 World Championships in Athletics and placed fifth in a time of 2:17:54 hours.

Uchikoshi was runner-up behind Tesfaye Tafa at the Amsterdam Marathon in 1991, finishing in 2:13:52 hours. He was runner-up at the Hokkaido Marathon in 1992 and was the second placed Japanese (sixth overall) at the 1993 Tokyo International Marathon. A personal best of 2:12:52 hours came in a fourth-place finish at the 1994 Rotterdam Marathon, but he failed to place highly in a marathon thereafter. He was a member of the Snow Brand Milk Products corporate running team. He attended Juntendo University and was part of the winning team for the 1988 Hakone Ekiden while there.

== International competitions ==
Year	Competition	Venue	Position	Event	Notes
1993	World Championships	Stuttgart, Germany	5th	Marathon	2:17:54
