= Abel Antón =

Spanish long-distance runner

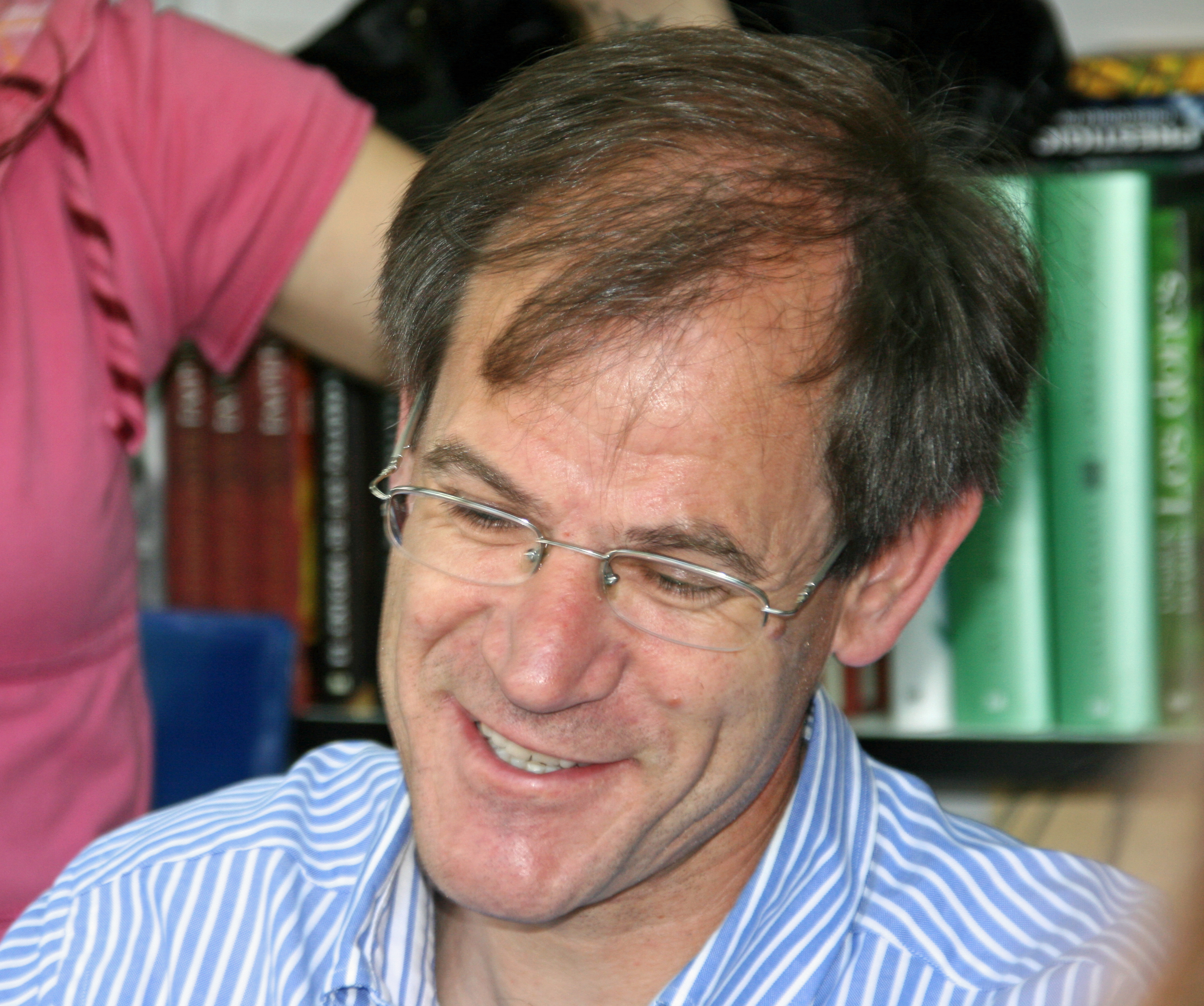
- Abel Antón, 6 June 2008

Medal record

Men's athletics

Representing Spain

World Championships
Gold medal – first place	1997 Athens	Marathon
Gold medal – first place	1999 Seville	Marathon

European Championships
Gold medal – first place	1994 Helsinki	10,000 m
Bronze medal – third place	1994 Helsinki	5000 m

Abel Antón Rodrigo (born 24 October 1962 in Ojuel, Cabrejas del Campo, Soria) is a Spanish former long-distance runner on the track and road. Anton won back-to-back world championships in the marathon in 1997 and 1999. He was a senator from 2011 to 2015, representing the Popular Party.

== Career ==
Antón began his career as a track runner. He competed in the 5000 m at the 1992 Olympics in Barcelona where he finished 8th in the final. He won the gold medal in the 10,000 m at the 1994 European Championships in Helsinki. He also won a bronze medal in the 5000 m at the same championships. At the 1996 Olympics in Atlanta, he competed in the 10,000 m finishing 13th.

Antón moved to the marathon distance in 1996 and won the Berlin Marathon on his debut at the distance in 2:09:15. In the following year, he won the gold medal in the marathon at the 1997 World Championships in Athens ahead of countryman and defending World champion Martín Fiz.

In 1998 Antón became the first Spanish runner to win the London Marathon in his personal best time 2:07:57 ahead of Abdelkader El Mouaziz. He finished third in the London Marathon in 1999 behind Abdelkader El Mouaziz and António Pinto in 2:09:41. He won his second gold medal in the marathon at 1999 World Championships in Seville becoming the first person to defend his title. The win gave him a major marathon win in 4 consecutive years from 1996 through 1999. He became Spanish Sportsman of the Year in 1999.

After an unsuccessful marathon race at the 2000 Olympics in Sydney, Antón concluded his career in 2001 and finished 8th in the London Marathon.

== Allegation ==
In 2006 Antón was implicated by Spanish professional cyclist and whistleblower Jesús Manzano in the doping ring with Alberto García and Reyes Estévez that was the focus of the Operación Puerto doping investigation by the Spanish Guardia Civil.
