= Kim Jong-su (runner) =

North Korean long-distance runner (born 1970)

Personal information
- Native name: 김정수
- Nationality: North Korean
- Born: 9 April 1970 (age 56)

Sport
- Sport: Long-distance running
- Event: Marathon

Kim Jong-su (born 9 April 1970) is a North Korean long-distance runner. He competed in the men's marathon at the 1996 Summer Olympics.

Kim finished 2nd at the 1995 Pyongyang Marathon in 2:12:40, 18 seconds behind Kim Jung-won. He again finished runner-up at the same race in March 1996, running his personal best of 2:11:43 less than one minute behind Jung-won again. In August that year, Kim finished 40th in the 1996 Olympic marathon, only 25 seconds behind Jung-won.

Kim returned in 1997 to compete in the Beijing Marathon. He finished 6th in 2:14:49 as the 2nd Korean behind Jung-won again.
