= Cabrejas del Campo =

- Municipality
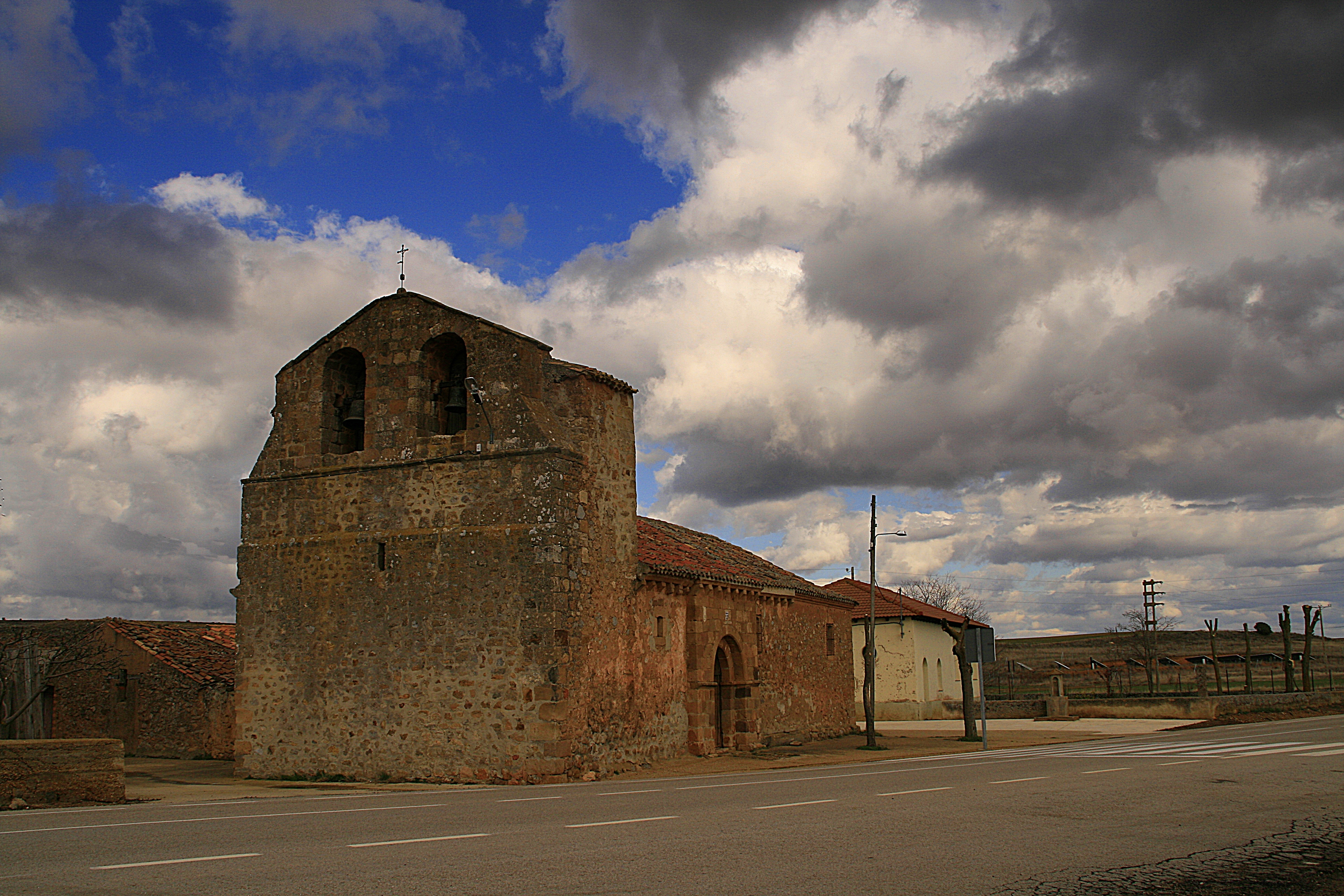

- Location in Spain. Cabrejas del Campo (Spain)
- Country: Spain
- Autonomous community: Castile and León
- Province: Soria
- Municipality: Cabrejas del Campo

Area
  - Total: 17.87 km^{2} (6.90 sq mi)
- Elevation: 991 m (3,251 ft)

Population (2025-01-01)
  - Total: 48
  - Density: 2.7/km^{2} (7.0/sq mi)
- Time zone: UTC+1 (CET)
  - Summer (DST): UTC+2 (CEST)
- Website: Official website

Cabrejas del Campo is a municipality located in the province of Soria, Castile and León, Spain. According to the 2004 census (INE), the municipality has a population of 79 inhabitants.
