= Stefano Baldini =

Italian marathon runner (born 1971)

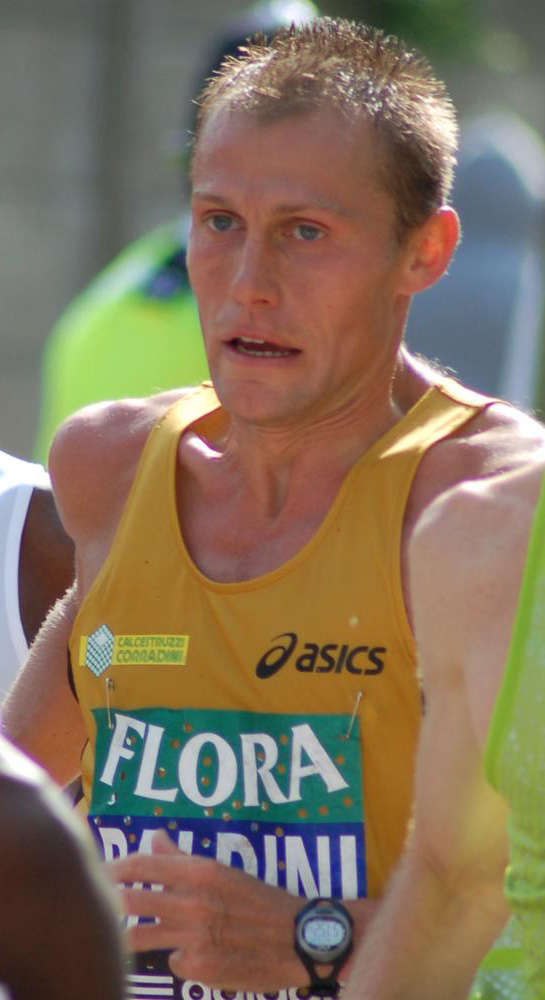

Personal information
- Nationality: Italian
- Born: 25 May 1971 (age 55) Castelnovo di Sotto, Italy
- Height: 1.76 m (5 ft 9 1/2 in)
- Weight: 62 kg (137 lb)

Sport
- Country: Italy
- Sport: Athletics
- Event: Marathon
- Coached by: Luciano Gigliotti

Achievements and titles
- Personal best: Marathon: 2:07:22 (2006)
Medal record
Men's athletics
Representing Italy
Olympic Games
Gold medal – first place	2004 Athens	Marathon
World Championships
Bronze medal – third place	2001 Edmonton	Marathon
Bronze medal – third place	2003 Paris	Marathon
European Championships
Gold medal – first place	1998 Budapest	Marathon
Gold medal – first place	2006 Gothenburg	Marathon
Half Marathon World Championships
Gold medal – first place	1996 Palma de Mallorca	Half marathon
World Marathon Cup
Silver medal – second place	2003 Paris	Team
Bronze medal – third place	2001 Edmonton	Team
European Marathon Cup
Gold medal – first place	1998 Budapest	Individual
Gold medal – first place	1998 Budapest	Team
Gold medal – first place	2006 Gothenburg	Team

Stefano Baldini (born 25 May 1971 in Castelnovo di Sotto, Emilia-Romagna, Italy) is a retired Italian runner who specialized in the marathon. He was the Olympic champion in Athens in 2004 and was twice European champion (1998 and 2006).

== Biography ==
Baldini was also a world champion in the half marathon, taking the title in Palma de Mallorca in 1996. In the 2004 Summer Olympics, Baldini finished first in the men's marathon, winning a gold medal. He finished ahead of Brazilian Vanderlei de Lima, who was leading the marathon until being pushed off the course by protester Neil Horan.

After a disappointing 2007 season in which he did not complete the London Marathon, Baldini chose to run the New York City Marathon, finishing 4th. Baldini closed his Olympic career at the 2008 Summer Olympics, finishing 12th.

Baldini ended his career in October 2010, having originally planned a final race at the Giro al Sas but deciding against the race because of injury.

== Achievements ==
Year	Competition	Venue	Position	Event	Notes
Representing Italy
1990	World Junior Championships	Plovdiv, Bulgaria	6th	5000m	13:54.38
1994	European Championships	Helsinki, Finland	20th	10,000m	28:41.82
1996	World Half Marathon Championships	Palma de Mallorca, Spain	1st	Half marathon	1:01:17
1997	London Marathon	London, United Kingdom	2nd	Marathon	2:07:57
1997	New York City Marathon	New York City, United States	3rd	Marathon	2:09:31
1998	Rome Marathon	Rome, Italy	1st	Marathon	2:09:33
1998	European Championships	Budapest, Hungary	1st	Marathon	2:12:01
2000	London Marathon	London, United Kingdom	6th	Marathon	2:09:45
2001	Turin Marathon	Turin, Italy	2nd	Marathon	2:08:51
2001	World Championships	Edmonton, Canada	3rd	Marathon	2:13:18
2001	Madrid Millenium Marathon	Madrid, Spain	1st	Marathon	2:09:59
2002	London Marathon	London, United Kingdom	6th	Marathon	2:07:29
2002	New York City Marathon	New York City, United States	5th	Marathon	2:09:12
2003	London Marathon	London, United Kingdom	2nd	Marathon	2:07:56
2003	World Championships	Paris, France	3rd	Marathon	2:09:14
2004	London Marathon	London, United Kingdom	4th	Marathon	2:08:37
2004	Olympic Games	Athens, Greece	1st	Marathon	2:10:55
2005	London Marathon	London, United Kingdom	5th	Marathon	2:09:25
2006	London Marathon	London, United Kingdom	5th	Marathon	2:07:22
2006	European Championships	Gothenburg, Sweden	1st	Marathon	2:11:32
2006	New York City Marathon	New York City, United States	6th	Marathon	2:11:33
2007	New York City Marathon	New York City, United States	4th	Marathon	2:11:58
2008	London Marathon	London, United Kingdom	12th	Marathon	2:13:06
2008	Olympic Games	Beijing, China	12th	Marathon	2:13:25

== National titles ==
He won 13 national championships.

- Italian Athletics Championships
  - 10,000 metres: 1993, 1994, 1995, 1996, 2001, 2002 (6)
  - 10 km road: 2010
  - Half marathon: 1995, 1998, 2001, 2004, 2006, 2009 (6)

== See also ==
- FIDAL Hall of Fame
- Italian all-time lists - 10000 metres
- Italian all-time lists - half marathon
- Italian all-time lists - Marathon
