= Masaki Oya (athlete) =

Japanese long-distance runner

Personal information
- Nationality: Japanese
- Born: 11 July 1966 (age 59)

Sport
- Sport: Long-distance running
- Event: Marathon

Masaki Oya (Japanese: 大家 正喜, Hepburn: Ōya Masaki; born 11 July 1966) is a Japanese long-distance runner. He competed in the men's marathon at the 1996 Summer Olympics.
