= António Salvador (athlete) =

Portuguese long-distance runner

António Salvador (born June 21, 1966) is a retired male long-distance runner from Portugal. He set his personal best in the men's marathon on April 5, 1998, in the Paris Marathon, clocking 2:12:39.

== Achievements ==
Year	Competition	Venue	Position	Event	Notes
Representing Portugal
1998	European Championships	Budapest, Hungary	10th	Marathon	2:14:28
1999	World Championships	Seville, Spain	—	Marathon	DNF
