= Antoni Peña =

Spanish long-distance runner

Antoni ("Toni") Peña Pico was born 26 August 1970, in Felanitx, Islas Baleares. He is a retired male long-distance runner from Spain, who specialized in the marathon during his career.

== Achievements ==
Year	Competition	Venue	Position	Event	Notes
Representing Spain
1992	World Half Marathon Championships	Newcastle, United Kingdom	12th	Half marathon	1:01:48
1994	European Championships	Helsinki, Finland	32nd	Marathon	2:17:19
1998	European Championships	Budapest, Hungary	6th	Marathon	2:13:53
1999	World Championships	Edmonton, Canada	—	Marathon	DNF
2000	Rotterdam Marathon	Rotterdam, Netherlands	5th	Marathon	2:08:59
2000	World Half Marathon Championships	Veracruz, Mexico	30th	Half marathon	1:07:11
2000	Berlin Marathon	Berlin, Germany	2nd	Marathon	2:07:47
2001	Lake Biwa Marathon	Ōtsu, Japan	1st	Marathon	2:07:34
2001	World Championships	Edmonton, Canada	24th	Marathon	2:23:29
2002	World Half Marathon Championships	Brussels, Belgium	45th	Half marathon	1:04:24
2002	Amsterdam Marathon	Amsterdam, Netherlands	4th	Marathon	2:08:08
2004	Olympic Games	Athens, Greece	18th	Marathon	2:16:38
2005	World Half Marathon Championships	Edmonton, Canada	22nd	Half marathon	1:03:52

=== Personal bests ===
- 10,000 metres - 28:02.1 min (2000)
- Half marathon - 1:01:48 hrs (1992)
- Marathon - 2:07:34 hrs (2001)
