= 1992 IAAF World Cross Country Championships – Senior men's race =

Senior men's race at the 1992 IAAF World Cross Country Championships
- Organisers: IAAF
- Edition: 20th
- Date: March 21
- Host city: Boston, Massachusetts, United States
- Venue: Franklin Park
- Events: 1
- Distances: 12.53 km – Senior men
- Participation: 233 athletes from 46 nations

The Senior men's race at the 1992 IAAF World Cross Country Championships was held in Boston, Massachusetts, United States, at the Franklin Park on March 21, 1992. A report on the event was given in The New York Times.

Complete results, medallists, and the results of British athletes were published.

== Race results ==
=== Senior men's race (12.53 km) ===
==== Individual ====
Rank	Athlete	Country	Time
1st place, gold medalist(s)	John Ngugi	Kenya	37:05
2nd place, silver medalist(s)	William Mutwol	Kenya	37:17
3rd place, bronze medalist(s)	Fita Bayissa	Ethiopia	37:18
4	Khalid Skah	Morocco	37:20
5	Richard Chelimo	Kenya	37:21
6	Steve Moneghetti	Australia	37:23
7	Dominic Kirui	Kenya	37:26
8	William Sigei	Kenya	37:27
9	Thierry Pantel	France	37:30
10	Bruno Le Stum	France	37:33
11	Domingos Castro	Portugal	37:35
12	Antonio Martins	France	37:37
13	Mathias Ntawulikura	Rwanda	37:39
14	José Regalo	Portugal	37:41
15	Richard Nerurkar	United Kingdom	37:43
16	Pere Arco	Spain	37:44
17	Eamonn Martin	United Kingdom	37:49
18	Vincent Rousseau	Belgium	37:50
19	Todd Williams	United States	37:51
20	Dave Clarke	United Kingdom	37:52
21	Pascal Thiébaut	France	37:53
22	Hammou Boutayeb	Morocco	37:54
23	Ondoro Osoro	Kenya	37:55
24	Martín Fiz	Spain	37:56
25	António Pinto	Portugal	37:57
26	Andy Bristow	United Kingdom	37:58
27	José Manuel García	Spain	37:59
28	José Carlos Adán	Spain	38:00
29	Renato Gotti	Italy	38:01
30	Rainer Wachenbrunner	Germany	38:02
31	Francesco Bennici	Italy	38:03
32	Christian Leuprecht	Italy	38:04
33	Paul Dugdale	United Kingdom	38:05
34	Mark Coogan	United States	38:09
35	Salvatore Bettiol	Italy	38:11
36	Mark Dalloway	United Kingdom	38:12
37	Carlos de la Torre	Spain	38:15
38	Umberto Pusterla	Italy	38:16
39	Antonio Pérez	Spain	38:17
40	Tendai Chimusasa	Zimbabwe	38:18
41	Kenneth Martin	United States	38:19
42	Mohamed El Massoudi	Morocco	38:19
43	John Halvorsen	Norway	38:20
44	Paul Aufdemberge	United States	38:21
45	Jean-Louis Prianon	France	38:22
46	Gerry Curtis	Ireland	38:23
47	Pat Carroll	Australia	38:23
48	Antonio Rapisarda	France	38:24
49	William Taylor	United States	38:24
50	Bernd Bürger	Germany	38:25
51	Risto Ulmala	Finland	38:27
52	Dieter Baumann	Germany	38:29
53	Herder Vázquez	Colombia	38:30
54	Richard Potts	New Zealand	38:30
55	John Downes	Ireland	38:31
56	Brahim Boutayeb	Morocco	38:31
57	Salah Hissou	Morocco	38:32
58	Shaun Creighton	Australia	38:32
59	Getaneh Tessema	Ethiopia	38:33
60	Aloÿs Nizigama	Burundi	38:34
61	Róbert Štefko	Czechoslovakia	38:34
62	Dionísio Castro	Portugal	38:35
63	Ruddy Walem	Belgium	38:36
64	Sean Dollman	Ireland	38:36
65	Rodney Higgins	Australia	38:36
66	Lahoussine Siba	Morocco	38:37
67	Oleg Strizhakov	Commonwealth of Independent States	38:37
68	Fernando Couto	Portugal	38:38
69	Juvenal Ribeiro	Portugal	38:39
70	José Ramon Moreno	Spain	38:39
71	Benedito Gomes	Brazil	38:40
72	Seamus Power	Ireland	38:41
73	Chala Kelele	Ethiopia	38:42
74	Kenjiro Jitsui	Japan	38:43
75	Noel Berkeley	Ireland	38:44
76	Brad Barquist	United States	38:44
77	Sammy Lelei	Kenya	38:45
78	Markus Graf	Switzerland	38:46
79	Jens Karrass	Germany	38:46
80	Francisco Guerra	Spain	38:47
81	Vincenzo Modica	Italy	38:48
82	Carsten Jørgensen	Denmark	38:49
83	Colin Dalton	Australia	38:50
84	Paulo Guerra	Portugal	38:50
85	Paul Roden	United Kingdom	38:51
86	Enrico Vivian	Italy	38:52
87	Addis Abebe	Ethiopia	38:52
88	Ivo Claes	Belgium	38:53
89	Joël Bourgeois	Canada	38:53
90	Valdenor dos Santos	Brazil	38:53
91	Herman Decoux	Belgium	38:54
92	Jorge Márquez	Mexico	38:54
93	Jos Maes	Belgium	38:55
94	Shannon Butler	United States	38:55
95	Peter Brett	Australia	38:56
96	Worku Bikila	Ethiopia	38:57
97	Doug Cronkite	Canada	38:57
98	Marcel Versteeg	Netherlands	38:58
99	Klaus-Peter Hansen	Denmark	38:59
100	Boay Akoney	Tanzania	39:00
101	David Evans	Australia	39:01
102	Leonardo Malgor	Argentina	39:02
103	Henk Gommer	Netherlands	39:02
104	Tommy Murray	United Kingdom	39:03
105	Chris Weber	Canada	39:04
106	Raf Wijns	Belgium	39:05
107	Abraham Assefa	Ethiopia	39:08
108	Art Boileau	Canada	39:10
109	Hamid Essebani	Morocco	39:12
110	Steffen Dittmann	Germany	39:14
111	Werner Schildhauer	Germany	39:15
112	Farid Khayrullin	Commonwealth of Independent States	39:16
113	Simretu Alemayehu	Ethiopia	39:17
114	Rafael Muñoz	Mexico	39:18
115	Chris Robison	United Kingdom	39:19
116	Manuel Matias	Portugal	39:20
117	Andrea Erni	Switzerland	39:21
118	Frank Hanley	Ireland	39:21
119	Aleksandr Burtsev	Commonwealth of Independent States	39:22
120	Dan Nelson	United States	39:23
121	Martin Bremer	Germany	39:24
122	Luis Ibarra	Brazil	39:26
123	Visa Orttenvuori	Finland	39:27
124	Aart Stigter	Netherlands	39:29
125	Aleksandr Mikitenko	Commonwealth of Independent States	39:30
126	Rod de Highden	Australia	39:34
127	Paul O'Callaghan	Ireland	39:36
128	Antoni Niemczak	Poland	39:37
129	Milfred Tewawina	United States	39:40
130	Hansjörg Brücker	Switzerland	39:41
131	Kidane Gebrmichael	Ethiopia	39:41
132	Vanderlei de Lima	Brazil	39:42
133	Sergey Maksimov	Commonwealth of Independent States	39:43
134	Paul McCloy	Canada	39:43
135	Oscar Amaya	Argentina	39:44
136	Koji Numata	Japan	39:44
137	Oscar González	Venezuela	39:44
138	Markku Kyyrönen	Finland	39:45
139	Maximino Ayala	Mexico	39:45
140	Rolando Vera	Ecuador	39:47
141	Herman Hofstee	Netherlands	39:48
142	Michał Bartoszak	Poland	39:51
143	Abderrahim Zitouna	Morocco	39:53
144	Jan Korevaar	Netherlands	39:54
145	Arnold Mächler	Switzerland	39:55
146	Akira Nakamura	Japan	39:56
147	Juan Ramón Muñoz	Spain	39:56
148	Juma Mnyampanda	Tanzania	39:57
149	Sven Schottman	Germany	39:58
150	Richard Mulligan	Ireland	39:59
151	Clair Wathier	Brazil	39:59
152	Rob Lonergan	Canada	40:00
153	Arturo Benavides	Mexico	40:01
154	Takeharu Honda	Japan	40:02
155	Winston Muzini	Zimbabwe	40:02
156	Marco Gielen	Netherlands	40:03
157	Jürg Stalder	Switzerland	40:03
158	Mark Elliott	Jamaica	40:04
159	Marcelo Cascabelo	Argentina	40:09
160	James Stafford	Canada	40:11
161	Nico Hamers	Netherlands	40:13
162	Brighton Chipere	Zimbabwe	40:16
163	Ikaji Salum	Tanzania	40:19
164	Noel Richardson	Ireland	40:21
165	Paul Arthur	Australia	40:27
166	Elarbi Khattabi	Morocco	40:33
167	Stéphane Franke	Germany	40:35
168	Toshinari Takaoka	Japan	40:36
169	Antanas Stancius	Lithuania	40:38
170	Andrey Usachov	Commonwealth of Independent States	40:42
171	Patrick Billette	Canada	40:54
172	Otoniel dos Santos	Brazil	40:57
173	Pascal Fetizon	France	40:59
174	Mike McGowan	Canada	41:01
175	Carlos Naput	Argentina	41:02
176	Adalberto Garcia	Brazil	41:05
177	Linton McKenzie	Jamaica	41:12
178	Geraldo Francisco de Assis	Brazil	41:20
179	Thomas Robert Naali	Tanzania	41:27
180	Hideyuki Suzuki	Japan	41:41
181	Paolo Donati	Italy	41:44
182	Ally Jumbe	Tanzania	41:46
183	Igor Sidorenko	Commonwealth of Independent States	41:52
184	Einius Vadapolas	Lithuania	41:58
185	Kuan Yuan-Shun	Chinese Taipei	42:09
186	Madan Singh	India	42:12
187	Bahadur Prasad	India	42:19
188	Passmore Furusa	Zimbabwe	42:25
189	Daniel Dasta	Israel	42:26
190	Miguel Ubaldo	Mexico	42:46
191	Delroy Hayden	Jamaica	43:03
192	Tsai Ching-Chou	Chinese Taipei	43:06
193	Osias Kamlase	Indonesia	43:08
194	Norval Jones	Jamaica	43:20
195	Georgios Loucaides	Cyprus	43:23
196	Kavin Smith	Bermuda	43:25
197	Gray Maverha	Zimbabwe	43:28
198	Derick Adamson	Jamaica	43:30
199	Kenneth Richards	Jamaica	43:33
200	Davendra Pradesh Singh	Fiji	43:35
201	Syarifudin	Indonesia	43:37
202	Ethel Hudzon	Indonesia	43:39
203	U.I. Saini	India	44:20
204	Patrick Moonsamy	Mauritius	44:23
205	Hon Kwai Kwok	Hong Kong	44:26
206	Pascal Face	Mauritius	44:29
207	Parluatan Siregar	Indonesia	44:31
208	Tracy Wright	Bermuda	44:50
209	Leela Ram	India	44:57
210	Eduard Nabunone	Indonesia	45:53
211	Ram Lal	India	46:32
212	Atmaram	India	46:33
213	Ashok Kumar	Fiji	46:34
214	Subeno	Indonesia	46:41
215	Bineshwar Prasad	Fiji	46:45
216	Moses Zarak Khan	Fiji	46:48
217	Prosnattam Lal	Fiji	47:02
218	Harsur Jiva	Fiji	48:11
219	Mahendra Prasad	Fiji	48:54
—	Paul Arpin	France	DNF
—	Arturo Barrios	Mexico	DNF
—	Aïssa Belaout	Algeria	DNF
—	Philimon Hanneck	Zimbabwe	DNF
—	Stefano Mei	Italy	DNF
—	Joaquim Pinheiro	Portugal	DNF
—	Jörgen Salo	Finland	DNF
—	Andrew Sambu	Tanzania	DNF
—	Antonio Silio	Argentina	DNF
—	Diomede Cishahayo	Burundi	DNF
—	Are Nakkim	Norway	DNF
—	Mickael Dufermont	France	DNF
—	Ricky Waichoon	Mauritius	DNF
—	Arega Aberaha	Ethiopia	DNF

==== Teams ====
Rank	Team	Points
1st place, gold medalist(s)	Kenya: John Ngugi / 1; William Mutwol / 2; Richard Chelimo / 5; Dominic Kirui / 7; William Sigei / 8; Ondoro Osoro / 23; (Sammy Lelei) / (77)	46
2nd place, silver medalist(s)	France: Thierry Pantel / 9; Bruno Le Stum / 10; Antonio Martins / 12; Pascal Thiébaut / 21; Jean-Louis Prianon / 45; Antonio Rapisarda / 48; (Pascal Fetizon) / (173); (Paul Arpin) / (DNF); (Mickael Dufermont) / (DNF)	145
3rd place, bronze medalist(s)	United Kingdom: Richard Nerurkar / 15; Eamonn Martin / 17; Dave Clarke / 20; Andy Bristow / 26; Paul Dugdale / 33; Mark Dalloway / 36; (Paul Roden) / (85); (Tommy Murray) / (104); (Chris Robison) / (115)	147
4	Spain: Pere Arco / 16; Martín Fiz / 24; José Manuel García / 27; José Carlos Adán / 28; Carlos de la Torre / 37; Antonio Pérez / 39; (José Ramon Moreno) / (70); (Francisco Guerra) / (80); (Juan Ramón Muñoz) / (147)	171
5	Italy: Renato Gotti / 29; Francesco Bennici / 31; Christian Leuprecht / 32; Salvatore Bettiol / 35; Umberto Pusterla / 38; Vincenzo Modica / 81; (Enrico Vivian) / (86); (Paolo Donati) / (181); (Stefano Mei) / (DNF)	246
6	Morocco: Khalid Skah / 4; Hammou Boutayeb / 22; Mohamed El Massoudi / 42; Brahim Boutayeb / 56; Salah Hissou / 57; Lahoussine Siba / 66; (Hamid Essebani) / (109); (Abderrahim Zitouna) / (143); (Elarbi Khattabi) / (166)	247
7	Portugal: Domingos Castro / 11; José Regalo / 14; António Pinto / 25; Dionísio Castro / 62; Fernando Couto / 68; Juvenal Ribeiro / 69; (Paulo Guerra) / (84); (Manuel Matias) / (116); (Joaquim Pinheiro) / (DNF)	249
8	United States: Todd Williams / 19; Mark Coogan / 34; Kenneth Martin / 41; Paul Aufdemberge / 44; William Taylor / 49; Brad Barquist / 76; (Shannon Butler) / (94); (Dan Nelson) / (120); (Milfred Tewawina) / (129)	263
9	Australia: Steve Moneghetti / 6; Pat Carroll / 47; Shaun Creighton / 58; Rodney Higgins / 65; Colin Dalton / 83; Peter Brett / 95; (David Evans) / (101); (Rod de Highden) / (126); (Paul Arthur) / (165)	354
10	Ethiopia: Fita Bayissa / 3; Getaneh Tessema / 59; Chala Kelele / 73; Addis Abebe / 87; Worku Bikila / 96; Abraham Assefa / 107; (Simretu Alemayehu) / (113); (Kidane Gebrmichael) / (131); (Arega Aberaha) / (DNF)	425
11	Ireland: Gerry Curtis / 46; John Downes / 55; Sean Dollman / 64; Seamus Power / 72; Noel Berkeley / 75; Frank Hanley / 118; (Paul O'Callaghan) / (127); (Richard Mulligan) / (150); (Noel Richardson) / (164)	430
12	Germany: Rainer Wachenbrunner / 30; Bernd Bürger / 50; Dieter Baumann / 52; Jens Karrass / 79; Steffen Dittmann / 110; Werner Schildhauer / 111; (Martin Bremer) / (121); (Sven Schottman) / (149); (Stéphane Franke) / (167)	432
13	Belgium: Vincent Rousseau / 18; Ruddy Walem / 63; Ivo Claes / 88; Herman Decoux / 91; Jos Maes / 93; Raf Wijns / 106	459
14	Canada: Joël Bourgeois / 89; Doug Cronkite / 97; Chris Weber / 105; Art Boileau / 108; Paul McCloy / 134; Rob Lonergan / 152; (James Stafford) / (160); (Patrick Billette) / (171); (Mike McGowan) / (174)	685
15	Commonwealth of Independent States: Oleg Strizhakov / 67; Farid Khayrullin / 112; Aleksandr Burtsev / 119; Aleksandr Mikitenko / 125; Sergey Maksimov / 133; Andrey Usachov / 170; (Igor Sidorenko) / (183)	726
16	Brazil: Benedito Gomes / 71; Valdenor dos Santos / 90; Luis Ibarra / 122; Vanderlei de Lima / 132; Clair Wathier / 151; Otoniel dos Santos / 172; (Adalberto Garcia) / (176); (Geraldo Francisco de Assis) / (178)	738
17	Netherlands: Marcel Versteeg / 98; Henk Gommer / 103; Aart Stigter / 124; Herman Hofstee / 141; Jan Korevaar / 144; Marco Gielen / 156; (Nico Hamers) / (161)	766
18	Japan: Kenjiro Jitsui / 74; Koji Numata / 136; Akira Nakamura / 146; Takeharu Honda / 154; Toshinari Takaoka / 168; Hideyuki Suzuki / 180	858
19	Jamaica: Mark Elliott / 158; Linton McKenzie / 177; Delroy Hayden / 191; Norval Jones / 194; Derick Adamson / 198; Kenneth Richards / 199	1117
20	India: Madan Singh / 186; Bahadur Prasad / 187; U.I. Saini / 203; Leela Ram / 209; Ram Lal / 211; Atmaram / 212	1208
21	Indonesia: Osias Kamlase / 193; Syarifudin / 201; Ethel Hudzon / 202; Parluatan Siregar / 207; Eduard Nabunone / 210; Subeno / 214	1227
22	Fiji: Davendra Pradesh Singh / 200; Ashok Kumar / 213; Bineshwar Prasad / 215; Moses Zarak Khan / 216; Prosnattam Lal / 217; Harsur Jiva / 218; (Mahendra Prasad) / (219)	1279
DNF	Mexico: Jorge Márquez / (92); Rafael Muñoz / (114); Maximino Ayala / (139); Arturo Benavides / (153); Miguel Ubaldo / (190); Arturo Barrios / (DNF)	DNF
DNF	Zimbabwe: Tendai Chimusasa / (40); Winston Muzini / (155); Brighton Chipere / (162); Passmore Furusa / (188); Gray Maverha / (197); Philimon Hanneck / (DNF)	DNF
DNF	Tanzania: Boay Akoney / (100); Juma Mnyampanda / (148); Ikaji Salum / (163); Thomas Robert Naali / (179); Ally Jumbe / (182); Andrew Sambu / (DNF)	DNF

- Note: Athletes in parentheses did not score for the team result

== Participation ==
An unofficial count yields the participation of 233 athletes from 46 countries in the Senior men's race. This is in agreement with the official numbers as published.

- Algeria (1)
- Argentina (5)
- Australia (9)
- Belgium (6)
- Bermuda (2)
- Brazil (8)
- Burundi (2)
- Canada (9)
- Chinese Taipei (2)
- Colombia (1)
- Commonwealth of Independent States (7)
- Cyprus (1)
- Czechoslovakia (1)
- Denmark (2)
- Ecuador (1)
- Ethiopia (9)
- Fiji (7)
- Finland (4)
- France (9)
- Germany (9)
- Hong Kong (1)
- India (6)
- Indonesia (6)
- Ireland (9)
- Israel (1)
- Italy (9)
- Jamaica (6)
- Japan (6)
- Kenya (7)
- Lithuania (2)
- Mauritius (3)
- Mexico (6)
- Morocco (9)
- Netherlands (7)
- New Zealand (1)
- Norway (2)
- Poland (2)
- Portugal (9)
- Rwanda (1)
- Spain (9)
- Switzerland (5)
- Tanzania (6)
- United Kingdom (9)
- United States (9)
- Venezuela (1)
- Zimbabwe (6)

== See also ==
- 1992 IAAF World Cross Country Championships – Junior men's race
- 1992 IAAF World Cross Country Championships – Senior women's race
- 1992 IAAF World Cross Country Championships – Junior women's race
