= 1992 IAAF World Cross Country Championships – Senior women's race =

Senior women's race at the 1992 IAAF World Cross Country Championships
- Organisers: IAAF
- Edition: 20th
- Date: March 21
- Host city: Boston, Massachusetts, United States
- Venue: Franklin Park
- Events: 1
- Distances: 6.37 km – Senior women
- Participation: 127 athletes from 35 nations

The Senior women's race at the 1992 IAAF World Cross Country Championships was held in Boston, Massachusetts, United States, at Franklin Park on March 21, 1992. Conditions were cool with snow on the ground. Lynn Jennings won her third consecutive World Cross Country title.

Complete results, medallists, and the results of British athletes were published.

== Race results ==
=== Senior women's race (6.37 km) ===
==== Individual ====
Rank	Athlete	Country	Time
1st place, gold medalist(s)	Lynn Jennings	United States	21:16
2nd place, silver medalist(s)	Catherina McKiernan	Ireland	21:18
3rd place, bronze medalist(s)	Albertina Dias	Portugal	21:19
4	Vicki Huber	United States	21:34
5	Nadia Dandolo	Italy	21:35
6	Qu Yunxia	China	21:36
7	Sonia O'Sullivan	Ireland	21:37
8	Jill Hunter	United Kingdom	21:39
9	Susan Sirma	Kenya	21:40
10	Luchia Yeshak	Ethiopia	21:42
11	Hellen Kimaiyo	Kenya	21:45
12	Jane Ngotho	Kenya	21:47
13	Estela Estévez	Spain	21:48
14	Liève Slegers	Belgium	21:49
15	Hellen Chepngeno	Kenya	21:50
16	Susan Hobson	Australia	21:51
17	Véronique Collard	Belgium	21:51
18	Conceição Ferreira	Portugal	21:52
19	Iulia Negura	Romania	21:54
20	Merima Denboba	Ethiopia	22:02
21	Daria Nauer	Switzerland	22:03
22	Angela Chalmers	Canada	22:03
23	Natalya Sorokivskaya	Commonwealth of Independent States	22:04
24	Zhora Koullou	France	22:05
25	Elena Fidatof	Romania	22:05
26	Christien Toonstra	Netherlands	22:06
27	Annette Palluy	France	22:08
28	Getenesh Urge	Ethiopia	22:09
29	Marie-Pierre Duros	France	22:11
30	Annette Peters	United States	22:13
31	Geraldine Hendricken	Ireland	22:15
32	Wilma van Onna	Netherlands	22:16
33	Lisa Harvey	Canada	22:17
34	Lisa York	United Kingdom	22:17
35	Maria Guida	Italy	22:18
36	Julia Vaquero	Spain	22:18
37	Nelly Glauser	Switzerland	22:19
38	Berhane Adere	Ethiopia	22:19
39	Maria Luisa Lárraga	Spain	22:20
40	Iulia Ionescu	Romania	22:21
41	Liz McColgan	United Kingdom	22:21
42	Sylvia Mosqueda	United States	22:22
43	Fernanda Marques	Portugal	22:23
44	Martha Ernstdóttir	Iceland	22:23
45	Anuța Cătună	Romania	22:24
46	Angie Hulley	United Kingdom	22:26
47	Melinda Schmidt	United States	22:28
48	Mikiko Oguni	Japan	22:31
49	Liu Li	China	22:32
50	Carmen Fuentes	Spain	22:32
51	Mónica Gama	Portugal	22:32
52	Nadezhda Ilyina	Commonwealth of Independent States	22:33
53	Lesley Morton	New Zealand	22:33
54	Lucy Smith	Canada	22:34
55	Orietta Mancia	Italy	22:34
56	Danuta Marczyk	Poland	22:35
57	Marjan Freriks	Netherlands	22:35
58	Manuela Machado	Portugal	22:36
59	Valentina Tauceri	Italy	22:37
60	Izumi Maki	Japan	22:38
61	Rita de Jesús	Brazil	22:38
62	Vikki McPherson	United Kingdom	22:39
63	Monica O'Reilly	Ireland	22:39
64	Laura Adam	United Kingdom	22:40
65	Teresa Duffy	Ireland	22:41
66	Naomi Yoshida	Japan	22:41
67	Elizabeth Miller	Australia	22:41
68	Jacqueline Etiemble	France	22:42
69	Fumiko Tsutsumi	Japan	22:42
70	Ulla Marquette	Canada	22:42
71	Kaori Kumura	Japan	22:43
72	Felicidade Sena	Portugal	22:43
73	Olga Nazarkina	Commonwealth of Independent States	22:43
74	Carlien Harms	Netherlands	22:44
75	Dolores Rizo	Spain	22:47
76	Valerie Chauvel	France	22:49
77	Krishna Stanton	Australia	22:50
78	Tina Jensen	Denmark	22:51
79	Ria van Landeghem	Belgium	22:52
80	Rosario Murcia	France	22:53
81	Benita Perez	Mexico	22:54
82	Sonia Betancourt	Mexico	22:55
83	Kristijna Loonen	Netherlands	22:57
84	Cristina Misaros	Romania	22:59
85	Tamara Salomon	Canada	23:03
86	Carmem de Oliveira	Brazil	23:07
87	Begoña Herraez	Spain	23:08
88	Ena Weinstein	Peru	23:09
89	Lisa Karnopp	United States	23:10
90	Pauline Konga	Kenya	23:11
91	Els Peiren	Belgium	23:11
92	Breda Dennehy	Ireland	23:12
93	Hatsumi Matsumoto	Japan	23:17
94	Sharon Clode	New Zealand	23:23
95	Rizoneide Vanderley	Brazil	23:26
96	Grethe Koens	Netherlands	23:28
97	Edna Lankry	Israel	23:31
98	Leticia Martinez	Mexico	23:34
99	Martha Tenorio	Ecuador	23:36
100	Najat Ouali	Morocco	23:50
101	Lynn Clayton	Australia	23:52
102	Stella Castro	Colombia	23:53
103	Solange de Souza	Brazil	23:57
104	Norma Fernández	Argentina	24:02
105	Mabel Arrua	Argentina	24:15
106	Vilija Birbalaite	Lithuania	24:17
107	Frida Run Thordardóttir	Iceland	24:18
108	Marina Rodchenkova	Commonwealth of Independent States	24:28
109	Kelly dos Santos	Brazil	24:36
110	Vilma Peña	Costa Rica	24:38
111	Shirley Torres	Costa Rica	24:51
112	Lidiette Valer	Costa Rica	24:53
113	Zulma Ortíz	Argentina	25:00
114	Nadezhda Tatarenkova	Commonwealth of Independent States	25:33
115	Andri Avraam	Cyprus	25:38
116	Margret Brynjolfsdóttir	Iceland	25:57
117	Inés Rodríguez	Argentina	26:21
118	Aparna Bhoyar	India	26:28
119	Mandy Lo	Hong Kong	26:57
120	Sunita Kumari	India	28:54
121	Isabel Cabeza	Costa Rica	29:38
—	Jenny Lund	Australia	DNF
—	Tigist Moreda	Ethiopia	DNF
—	Derartu Tulu	Ethiopia	DNF
—	Vally Satayabhama	India	DNF
—	Bryndis Ernstdóttir	Iceland	DNF
—	Leelanuna Aparna	India	DNF

==== Teams ====
Rank	Team	Points
1st place, gold medalist(s)	Kenya: Susan Sirma / 9; Hellen Kimaiyo / 11; Jane Ngotho / 12; Hellen Chepngeno / 15; (Pauline Konga) / (90)	47
2nd place, silver medalist(s)	United States: Lynn Jennings / 1; Vicki Huber / 4; Annette Peters / 30; Sylvia Mosqueda / 42; (Melinda Schmidt) / (47); (Lisa Karnopp) / (89)	77
3rd place, bronze medalist(s)	Ethiopia: Luchia Yeshak / 10; Merima Denboba / 20; Getenesh Urge / 28; Berhane Adere / 38; (Tigist Moreda) / (DNF); (Derartu Tulu) / (DNF)	96
4	Ireland: Catherina McKiernan / 2; Sonia O'Sullivan / 7; Geraldine Hendricken / 31; Monica O'Reilly / 63; (Teresa Duffy) / (65); (Breda Dennehy) / (92)	103
5	Portugal: Albertina Dias / 3; Conceição Ferreira / 18; Fernanda Marques / 43; Mónica Gama / 51; (Manuela Machado) / (58); (Felicidade Sena) / (72)	115
6	Romania: Iulia Negura / 19; Elena Fidatof / 25; Iulia Ionescu / 40; Anuța Cătună / 45; (Cristina Misaros) / (84)	129
7	United Kingdom: Jill Hunter / 8; Lisa York / 34; Liz McColgan / 41; Angie Hulley / 46; (Vikki McPherson) / (62); (Laura Adam) / (64)	129
8	Spain: Estela Estévez / 13; Julia Vaquero / 36; Maria Luisa Lárraga / 39; Carmen Fuentes / 50; (Dolores Rizo) / (75); (Begoña Herraez) / (87)	138
9	France: Zhora Koullou / 24; Annette Palluy / 27; Marie-Pierre Duros / 29; Jacqueline Etiemble / 68; (Valerie Chauvel) / (76); (Rosario Murcia) / (80)	148
10	Italy: Nadia Dandolo / 5; Maria Guida / 35; Orietta Mancia / 55; Valentina Tauceri / 59	154
11	Canada: Angela Chalmers / 22; Lisa Harvey / 33; Lucy Smith / 54; Ulla Marquette / 70; (Tamara Salomon) / (85)	179
12	Netherlands: Christien Toonstra / 26; Wilma van Onna / 32; Marjan Freriks / 57; Carlien Harms / 74; (Kristijna Loonen) / (83); (Grethe Koens) / (96)	189
13	Belgium: Liève Slegers / 14; Véronique Collard / 17; Ria van Landeghem / 79; Els Peiren / 91	201
14	Japan: Mikiko Oguni / 48; Izumi Maki / 60; Naomi Yoshida / 66; Fumiko Tsutsumi / 69; (Kaori Kumura) / (71); (Hatsumi Matsumoto) / (93)	243
15	Commonwealth of Independent States: Natalya Sorokivskaya / 23; Nadezhda Ilyina / 52; Olga Nazarkina / 73; Marina Rodchenkova / 108; (Nadezhda Tatarenkova) / (114)	256
16	Australia: Susan Hobson / 16; Elizabeth Miller / 67; Krishna Stanton / 77; Lynn Clayton / 101; (Jenny Lund) / (DNF)	261
17	Brazil: Rita de Jesús / 61; Carmem de Oliveira / 86; Rizoneide Vanderley / 95; Solange de Souza / 103; (Kelly dos Santos) / (109)	345
18	Argentina: Norma Fernández / 104; Mabel Arrua / 105; Zulma Ortíz / 113; Inés Rodríguez / 117	439
19	Costa Rica: Vilma Peña / 110; Shirley Torres / 111; Lidiette Valer / 112; Isabel Cabeza / 121	454
DNF	Iceland: Martha Ernstdóttir / (44); Frida Run Thordardóttir / (107); Margret Brynjolfsdóttir / (116); Bryndis Ernstdóttir / (DNF)	DNF
DNF	India: Aparna Bhoyar / (118); Sunita Kumari / (120); Vally Satayabhama / (DNF); Leelanuna Aparna / (DNF)	DNF

- Note: Athletes in parentheses did not score for the team result

== Participation ==
An unofficial count yields the participation of 127 athletes from 35 countries in the Senior women's race. This is in agreement with the official numbers as published.

- Argentina (4)
- Australia (5)
- Belgium (4)
- Brazil (5)
- Canada (5)
- China (2)
- Colombia (1)
- Commonwealth of Independent States (5)
- Costa Rica (4)
- Cyprus (1)
- Denmark (1)
- Ecuador (1)
- Ethiopia (6)
- France (6)
- Hong Kong (1)
- Iceland (4)
- India (4)
- Ireland (6)
- Israel (1)
- Italy (4)
- Japan (6)
- Kenya (5)
- Lithuania (1)
- Mexico (3)
- Morocco (1)
- Netherlands (6)
- New Zealand (2)
- Peru (1)
- Poland (1)
- Portugal (6)
- Romania (5)
- Spain (6)
- Switzerland (2)
- United Kingdom (6)
- United States (6)

== See also ==
- 1992 IAAF World Cross Country Championships – Senior men's race
- 1992 IAAF World Cross Country Championships – Junior men's race
- 1992 IAAF World Cross Country Championships – Junior women's race
