= 1996 IAAF World Road Relay Championships =

- Dates: 13–14 April 1996
- Host city: Copenhagen, Denmark
- Level: Senior
- Type: Marathon relay
- Events: 2
- Participation: 282 athletes from 34 nations

The 1996 IAAF World Road Relay Championships was the third edition of the global, international marathon relay competition, organised by the International Association of Athletics Federations (IAAF). The event took place on 13–14 April on the streets of Copenhagen, Denmark with the participation of 282 athletes (174 men and 108 women) from 34 nations. The women's race took place on Saturday 13 April and the men's race took place on Sunday 14 April.

Each national team consisted of six athletes, who alternately covered six stages to complete the 42.195 km marathon distance. The first, third and fifth stages were of 5 km, the second and fourth stages were of 10 km, and the final stage covered the remaining 7.195 km.

In the women's race, Genet Gebregiorgis and Berhane Adere established a 38-second lead for Ethiopia over the first two legs. The nation dominated the competition to win in a championship record of 2:16:04, having the fastest runner in every stage, bar an interruption of Italy's Silvia Sommaggio on the third leg. The Romanian and Japanese teams traded places for the runner-up spot, but a decisive final leg by Elena Fidatov brought the Romanians the silver medals by a margin of 17 seconds.

In the men's race, it was the Kenyan team that dominated, with Simon Rono and Joseph Kimani establishing a lead of 41 seconds over the first two stages and David Kipruto grabbing the fastest time in the fifth stage. The Brazilians closed the gap slightly in the mid-race thanks to Delmir dos Santos, but ultimately ended up runners-up with a time of 2:01:24 hours behind Kenya's 2:00:40. Ethiopia and the hosts Denmark battled for the bronze position throughout the race but a strong final leg by Ethiopia's Worku Bikila resulted in a time of 2:01:50 hours, putting clear distance between the two teams.

== Medal summary ==
Event	Gold		Silver		Bronze	
Men's race	Kenya; Simon Rono (5 km – 13:45); Joseph Kimani (10 km – 28:33); Mark Yatich (5 km – 14:33); Stephen Kirwa (10 km – 29:00); David Kipruto (5 km – 14:09); William Kiptum (7.195 km – 20:40)	2:00:40	Brazil; Wander Moura (5 km – 13:49); Vanderlei de Lima (10 km – 29:10); Edgar de Oliveira (5 km – 14:26); Delmir dos Santos (10 km – 28:31); Tomix da Costa (5 km – 14:26); Ronaldo da Costa (7.195 km – 21:02)	2:01:24	Ethiopia; Lemi Erpassa (5 km – 13:58); Kidane Gebremichael (10 km – 29:20); Sisay Bezabeh (5 km – 14:23); Abraham Assefa (10 km – 29:13); Tegenu Abebe (5 km – 14:42); Worku Bikila (7.195 km – 20:14)	2:01:50
Women's race	Ethiopia; Genet Gebregiorgis (5 km – 15:53); Berhane Adere (10 km – 32:21); Ayelech Worku (5 km – 16:15); Gete Wami (10 km – 32:25); Getenesh Urge (5 km – 16:00); Luchia Yishak (7.195 km – 23:10)	2:16:04	Romania; Iulia Ionescu (5 km – 15:59); Mariana Chirila (10 km – 33:21); Lelia Deselnicu (5 km – 16:16); Iulia Negură (10 km – 32:53); Luminita Gogîrlea (5 km – 16:33); Elena Fidatov (7.195 km – 23:39)	2:18:41	Japan; Yukiko Okamoto (5 km – 15:56); Naomi Sakashita (10 km – 32:56); Ai Fukuchi (5 km – 16:11); Ikuyo Goto (10 km – 33:38); Noriko Ura (5 km – 16:08); Eri Yamaguchi (7.195 km – 24:09)	2:18:58

== Stage winners ==
Stage	Distance	Men	Time	Women	Time
1	5 km	Simon Rono (KEN)	13:45	Genet Gebregiorgis (ETH)	15:53
2	10 km	Joseph Kimani (KEN)	28:33	Berhane Adere (ETH)	32:21
3	5 km	Peter Mavura (ZIM)	14:13	Silvia Sommaggio (ITA)	16:00
4	10 km	Delmir dos Santos (BRA)	28:31	Gete Wami (ETH)	32:25
5	5 km	David Kipruto (KEN)	14:09	Getenesh Urge (ETH)	16:00
6	7.195 km	Worku Bikila (ETH)	20:14	Luchia Yishak (ETH)	23:10

== Results ==
=== Men's race ===
Rank	Team	Time
1	Kenya; Simon Rono; Joseph Kimani; Mark Yatich; Stephen Kirwa; David Kipruto; William Kiptum	2:00:40
2	Brazil; Wander Moura; Vanderlei de Lima; Edgar de Oliveira; Delmir dos Santos; Tomix da Costa; Ronaldo da Costa	2:01:24
3	Ethiopia; Lemi Erpassa; Kidane Gebremichael; Sisay Bezabeh; Abraham Assefa; Tegenu Abebe; Worku Bikila	2:01:50
4	Denmark; Dennis Jensen; Jan Ikov; Rene Carlsen; Klaus Peter Hansen; Kare Sørensen; Carsten Jørgensen	2:02:38
5	Russia; Aleksandr Vasilyev; Sergey Fedotov; Aleksandr Bolkhovitin; Gennadiy Panin; Vladimir Gusukin; Yuriy Punda	2:03:37
6	Mexico; David Galindo; Victor Rodríguez; Jesús Primo; Benjamín Paredes; Ruben García; Martín Rodríguez	2:03:48
7	Japan; Takayuki Ishimoto; Tomoaki Kunichika; Takayuki Inubushi; Takeo Nakahara; Kazutaka Enoki; Hisayuki Okawa	2:03:52
8	United Kingdom; Neil Caddy; Jon Solly; Ian Gillespie; Chris Sweeney; Christian Stephenson; Robert Quinn	2:03:55

=== Women's race ===
Rank	Team	Time
1	Ethiopia; Genet Gebregiorgis; Berhane Adere; Ayelech Worku; Gete Wami; Getenesh Urge; Luchia Yishak	2:16:04
2	Romania; Iulia Ionescu; Mariana Chirila; Lelia Deselnicu; Iulia Negură; Luminita Gogîrlea; Elena Fidatov	2:18:41
3	Japan; Yukiko Okamoto; Naomi Sakashita; Ai Fukuchi; Ikuyo Goto; Noriko Ura; Eri Yamaguchi	2:18:58
4	Italy; Patrizia Di Napoli; Simona Viola; Silvia Sommaggio; Maura Viceconte; Sara Ferrari; Roberta Brunet	2:20:02
5	Norway; Hilde Stavik; Gunhild Halle; Maiken Sørum; Grete Kirkeberg; Stine Larsen; Anita Håkenstad	2:20:56
6	Russia; Nina Belikova; Nadezhda Tatarenkova; Nadezhda Izadyorova; Natalya Solominskaya; Nadezhda Galyamova; Lyudmila Petrova	2:21:30
7	United Kingdom; Rhona Makepeace; Suzanne Rigg; Amanda Wright; Angie Hulley; Sarah Bentley; Vikki McPherson	2:21:41
8	France; Marie-Pierre Duros; Rosario Murcia; Véronique Bertel; Isabelle Guillot; Florence Fournery; Maria Rebelo	2:22:53
