= 1992 IAAF World Cross Country Championships – Junior men's race =

Junior men's race at the 1992 IAAF World Cross Country Championships
- Organisers: IAAF
- Edition: 20th
- Date: March 21
- Host city: Boston, Massachusetts, United States
- Venue: Franklin Park
- Events: 1
- Distances: 7.8 km – Junior men
- Participation: 114 athletes from 27 nations

The Junior men's race at the 1992 IAAF World Cross Country Championships was held in Boston, Massachusetts, United States, at the Franklin Park on March 21, 1992. A report on the event was given in The New York Times.

Complete results, medallists, and the results of British athletes were published.

== Race results ==
=== Junior men's race (7.8 km) ===
==== Individual ====
Rank	Athlete	Country	Time
1st place, gold medalist(s)	Ismael Kirui	Kenya	23:27
2nd place, silver medalist(s)	Haile Gebrselassie	Ethiopia	23:35
3rd place, bronze medalist(s)	Josephat Machuka	Kenya	23:37
4	Josephat Kiprono N'Deti	Kenya	23:45
5	Tegenu Abebe	Ethiopia	23:50
6	Francis Nade	Tanzania	23:54
7	Yasuyuki Watanabe	Japan	23:58
8	Gerbaba Eticha	Ethiopia	24:16
9	Antony Mwingereza	Tanzania	24:19
10	Samuel Otieno	Kenya	24:20
11	Mark Kipsang Too	Kenya	24:22
12	Kazuhiro Kawauchi	Japan	24:23
13	Tesgie Legesse	Ethiopia	24:25
14	Hicham El Guerrouj	Morocco	24:26
15	Philip Starr	New Zealand	24:28
16	Mimoun Rahmouni	Morocco	24:30
17	Jason Casiano	United States	24:31
18	Maurizio Leone	Italy	24:33
19	Tarek Zoghmar	Algeria	24:35
20	Maurizio Gemetto	Italy	24:37
21	Onesmo Ludago	Tanzania	24:39
22	Emerson Vettori	Brazil	24:41
23	Mounir Khelil	France	24:43
24	Pablo Olmedo	Mexico	24:44
25	Juan Carlos Rosero	Spain	24:45
26	Kevin Toher	United Kingdom	24:46
27	Greg van Hest	Netherlands	24:48
28	Jeff Schiebler	Canada	24:49
29	Kevin Sullivan	Canada	24:50
30	David Robertson	United Kingdom	24:51
31	Colin Jones	United Kingdom	24:52
32	Masaki Yamamoto	Japan	24:53
33	Abderrazak Marchoud	Morocco	24:54
34	Shane Garcia	United States	24:55
35	Javier Rodríguez	Spain	24:56
36	Ahmed Boulahia	Algeria	24:58
37	Arnaud Crepieux	France	25:00
38	José Rios	Spain	25:01
39	Daisuke Isomatsu	Japan	25:02
40	Mohamed Belasri	Morocco	25:03
41	Oliver Wirz	Switzerland	25:04
42	Ryoji Maeda	Japan	25:05
43	Mohamed Oulahmidi	Morocco	25:06
44	Antonio Andriani	Italy	25:08
45	Antonio Cardoso	Portugal	25:09
46	Marco Mattiello	Italy	25:10
47	Steffen Brandis	Germany	25:11
48	Spencer Barden	United Kingdom	25:12
49	Shigekazu Taguchi	Japan	25:13
50	Henrik Knudsen	Denmark	25:13
51	Bruno Toledo	Spain	25:14
52	Mustapha Ouaziz	Morocco	25:15
53	Viktor Röthlin	Switzerland	25:15
54	Edward Fitzpatrick	United States	25:16
55	Christopher Georgules	United States	25:17
56	Rene Carlsen	Denmark	25:18
57	Laurent Fourrage	France	25:19
58	André Green	Germany	25:20
59	Eliseo Martín	Spain	25:21
60	Abderrahmane Daas	Algeria	25:22
61	Heinz Lehmann	Switzerland	25:23
62	Jon Wild	United Kingdom	25:24
63	Stelios Marneros	Cyprus	25:25
64	Daniel de Clerck	Belgium	25:26
65	Jeff Lockyer	Canada	25:26
66	Guido Streit	Germany	25:27
67	Rick Obleman	Canada	25:28
68	Donal O'Sullivan	Ireland	25:29
69	Oliver Benoit	France	25:30
70	Emerson Bem	Brazil	25:31
71	Scott MacDonald	Canada	25:33
72	James dos Santos	Brazil	25:34
73	Carlos Paradelo	United States	25:35
74	Michael Richardson	United States	25:37
75	Chérif Tayeb Bachir	Algeria	25:38
76	Darren Burke	Ireland	25:39
77	Fabien Boukla	France	25:40
78	Dainius Saucikovas	Lithuania	25:42
79	Thomas Fuchs	Switzerland	25:44
80	Hector Fernandez	Mexico	25:46
81	Juan Luis Gómez	Spain	25:48
82	Cláudio da Silva	Brazil	25:50
83	Richard Collier	United Kingdom	25:52
84	Elias Bastos	Brazil	25:53
85	Darren Keenan	Ireland	25:54
86	Christophe Retou	France	26:01
87	William Roldán	Colombia	26:03
88	Derek Waters	Ireland	26:04
89	Abdelhamid Hadef	Algeria	26:06
90	Christian Friis	Denmark	26:11
91	Freeman Rogers	Canada	26:15
92	Ciaran Meehan	Ireland	26:19
93	Stathis Stasi	Cyprus	26:23
94	Christian Due Pedersen	Denmark	26:26
95	Francesco Germano	Italy	26:29
96	Mark Ostendarp	Germany	26:31
97	Eyel Gur	Israel	26:33
98	Jai Krishnan	India	26:47
99	Juma Ninga	Tanzania	26:49
100	Georgios Kaloeropoulo	Cyprus	26:50
101	Khristos Papapetrou	Cyprus	26:59
102	Tomas Karosas	Lithuania	27:00
103	Kailash Mane	India	27:01
104	Michael Lemmer	Switzerland	27:11
105	Charalambos Svanas	Cyprus	27:15
106	Søren Helmer	Denmark	27:22
107	Alan O'Gorman	Ireland	27:36
108	Bhupinder Singh Tyagi	India	28:21
109	Harvinder Singh	India	28:48
110	Ram Dular	India	30:42
—	Dirk Berger	Germany	DNF
—	Mansukh Singh	India	DNF
—	Rico Hohenberger	Germany	DNF
—	Aissa Menai	Algeria	DNF

==== Teams ====
Rank	Team	Points
1st place, gold medalist(s)	Kenya: Ismael Kirui / 1; Josephat Machuka / 3; Josephat Kiprono N'Deti / 4; Samuel Otieno / 10; (Mark Kipsang Too) / (11)	18
2nd place, silver medalist(s)	Ethiopia: Haile Gebrselassie / 2; Tegenu Abebe / 5; Gerbaba Eticha / 8; Tesgie Legesse / 13	28
3rd place, bronze medalist(s)	Japan: Yasuyuki Watanabe / 7; Kazuhiro Kawauchi / 12; Masaki Yamamoto / 32; Daisuke Isomatsu / 39; (Ryoji Maeda) / (42); (Shigekazu Taguchi) / (49)	90
4	Morocco: Hicham El Guerrouj / 14; Mimoun Rahmouni / 16; Abderrazak Marchoud / 33; Mohamed Belasri / 40; (Mohamed Oulahmidi) / (43); (Mustapha Ouaziz) / (52)	103
5	Italy: Maurizio Leone / 18; Maurizio Gemetto / 20; Antonio Andriani / 44; Marco Mattiello / 46; (Francesco Germano) / (95)	128
6	United Kingdom: Kevin Toher / 26; David Robertson / 30; Colin Jones / 31; Spencer Barden / 48; (Jon Wild) / (62); (Richard Collier) / (83)	135
7	Tanzania: Francis Nade / 6; Antony Mwingereza / 9; Onesmo Ludago / 21; Juma Ninga / 99	135
8	Spain: Juan Carlos Rosero / 25; Javier Rodríguez / 35; José Rios / 38; Bruno Toledo / 51; (Eliseo Martín) / (59); (Juan Luis Gómez) / (81)	149
9	United States: Jason Casiano / 17; Shane Garcia / 34; Edward Fitzpatrick / 54; Christopher Georgules / 55; (Carlos Paradelo) / (73); (Michael Richardson) / (74)	160
10	France: Mounir Khelil / 23; Arnaud Crepieux / 37; Laurent Fourrage / 57; Oliver Benoit / 69; (Fabien Boukla) / (77); (Christophe Retou) / (86)	186
11	Canada: Jeff Schiebler / 28; Kevin Sullivan / 29; Jeff Lockyer / 65; Rick Obleman / 67; (Scott MacDonald) / (71); (Freeman Rogers) / (91)	189
12	Algeria: Tarek Zoghmar / 19; Ahmed Boulahia / 36; Abderrahmane Daas / 60; Chérif Tayeb Bachir / 75; (Abdelhamid Hadef) / (89); (Aissa Menai) / (DNF)	190
13	Switzerland: Oliver Wirz / 41; Viktor Röthlin / 53; Heinz Lehmann / 61; Thomas Fuchs / 79; (Michael Lemmer) / (104)	234
14	Brazil: Emerson Vettori / 22; Emerson Bem / 70; James dos Santos / 72; Cláudio da Silva / 82; (Elias Bastos) / (84)	246
15	Germany: Steffen Brandis / 47; André Green / 58; Guido Streit / 66; Mark Ostendarp / 96; (Dirk Berger) / (DNF); (Rico Hohenberger) / (DNF)	267
16	Denmark: Henrik Knudsen / 50; Rene Carlsen / 56; Christian Friis / 90; Christian Due Pedersen / 94; (Søren Helmer) / (106)	290
17	Ireland: Donal O'Sullivan / 68; Darren Burke / 76; Darren Keenan / 85; Derek Waters / 88; (Ciaran Meehan) / (92); (Alan O'Gorman) / (107)	317
18	Cyprus: Stelios Marneros / 63; Stathis Stasi / 93; Georgios Kaloeropoulo / 100; Khristos Papapetrou / 101; (Charalambos Svanas) / (105)	357
19	India: Jai Krishnan / 98; Kailash Mane / 103; Bhupinder Singh Tyagi / 108; Harvinder Singh / 109; (Ram Dular) / (110); (Mansukh Singh) / (DNF)	418

- Note: Athletes in parentheses did not score for the team result

== Participation ==
An unofficial count yields the participation of 114 athletes from 27 countries in the Junior men's race. This is in agreement with the official numbers as published.

- Algeria (6)
- Belgium (1)
- Brazil (5)
- Canada (6)
- Colombia (1)
- Cyprus (5)
- Denmark (5)
- Ethiopia (4)
- France (6)
- Germany (6)
- India (6)
- Ireland (6)
- Israel (1)
- Italy (5)
- Japan (6)
- Kenya (5)
- Lithuania (2)
- Mexico (2)
- Morocco (6)
- Netherlands (1)
- New Zealand (1)
- Portugal (1)
- Spain (6)
- Switzerland (5)
- Tanzania (4)
- United Kingdom (6)
- United States (6)

== See also ==
- 1992 IAAF World Cross Country Championships – Senior men's race
- 1992 IAAF World Cross Country Championships – Senior women's race
- 1992 IAAF World Cross Country Championships – Junior women's race
