= 1992 IAAF World Cross Country Championships – Junior women's race =

Junior women's race

Junior women's race at the 1992 IAAF World Cross Country Championships
- Organisers: IAAF
- Edition: 20th
- Date: March 21
- Host city: Boston, Massachusetts, United States
- Venue: Franklin Park
- Events: 1
- Distances: 4.005 km – Junior women
- Participation: 106 athletes from 29 nations

The Junior women's race at the 1992 IAAF World Cross Country Championships was held in Boston, Massachusetts, United States, at the Franklin Park on March 21, 1992. A report on the event was given in The New York Times.

Complete results, medallists, and the results of British athletes were published.

== Race results ==
=== Junior women's race (4.005 km) ===
==== Individual ====
Rank	Athlete	Country	Time
1st place, gold medalist(s)	Paula Radcliffe	United Kingdom	13:30
2nd place, silver medalist(s)	Wang Junxia	China	13:35
3rd place, bronze medalist(s)	Lydia Cheromei	Kenya	13:43
4	Jennifer Clague	United Kingdom	13:44
5	Anja Smolders	Belgium	13:58
6	Janeth Caizalitín	Ecuador	14:00
7	Elena Cosoveanu	Romania	14:02
8	Zhang Lirong	China	14:03
9	Gete Wami	Ethiopia	14:04
10	Denisa Costescu	Romania	14:05
11	Emebet Shiferaw	Ethiopia	14:06
12	Susie Power	Australia	14:06
13	Ruth Biwott	Kenya	14:07
14	Annemari Sandell	Finland	14:07
15	Pamela Hunt	United States	14:08
16	Susan Chepkemei	Kenya	14:08
17	Genet Gebregiorgis	Ethiopia	14:08
18	Kore Alemu	Ethiopia	14:08
19	Satoko Mizuuchi	Japan	14:10
20	Gabriela Szabo	Romania	14:12
21	Sharon Murphy	United Kingdom	14:13
22	Ileana Dorca	Romania	14:15
23	Azumi Miyazaki	Japan	14:17
24	Zhang Linli	China	14:19
25	Dörte Köster	Germany	14:20
26	Christine Hofmeier	Switzerland	14:21
27	Pamela Chepchumba	Kenya	14:22
28	Kathy Butler	Canada	14:23
29	Ana Gimeno	Spain	14:24
30	Keiko Kato	Japan	14:25
31	Chiemi Takahashi	Japan	14:25
32	Jennifer Howard	United States	14:25
33	Rocío Martínez	Spain	14:25
34	Askale Bereda	Ethiopia	14:28
35	Karen Whetton	United Kingdom	14:30
36	Tanya Blake	United Kingdom	14:32
37	Marta Domínguez	Spain	14:33
38	Sandra Ruales	Ecuador	14:33
39	Stéphanie Berthevas	France	14:34
40	Annie Troussard	France	14:35
41	Tiziana Alagia	Italy	14:36
42	Séverine Foulon	France	14:39
43	Violetta Maron	Poland	14:41
44	Gu Dongmei	China	14:44
45	Fleur Deconihout	France	14:45
46	Lindsay McLaren	Canada	14:46
47	Julie Beckhaus	Australia	14:48
48	Rosanna Martin	Italy	14:49
49	Helga Rauch	Italy	14:49
50	Constanze Effler	Germany	14:50
51	Marie-Luce Romanens	Switzerland	14:51
52	Cécile Tricot	France	14:51
53	Ornella Brion	Italy	14:51
54	Bouchra Moustaid	Morocco	14:53
55	Kerry Mackay	United Kingdom	14:55
56	Mónika Tóth	Hungary	14:56
57	Sylvie Nael	France	14:57
58	Heike Hoffmann	Germany	14:58
59	Catherine Kirui	Kenya	14:58
60	Friederike Schmidt	Germany	14:59
61	Kim Kelly	United States	14:59
62	Laura Woeller	United States	15:00
63	Yoko Yamamoto	Japan	15:00
64	Nicole Stevenson	Canada	15:01
65	Janice Turner	Jamaica	15:02
66	Mónica Aláez	Spain	15:03
67	Renata Borzecka	Poland	15:04
68	Anna Jakubczak	Poland	15:04
69	Susanne Hornung	Germany	15:05
70	Ana Nanu	Romania	15:06
71	Angela Schwan	Canada	15:07
72	Soledad Nieto	Ecuador	15:08
73	Natalia Requena	Spain	15:08
74	Renáta Fülöp	Hungary	15:09
75	Doa Suleiman	Israel	15:10
76	Suzy Walsham	Australia	15:15
77	Goska Biela	Poland	15:17
78	Jacqueline Martín	Spain	15:19
79	Alemitu Bekele	Ethiopia	15:22
80	Akiko Kato	Japan	15:24
81	Juanita Sanchez	Mexico	15:25
82	Nathalie Bowden	Canada	15:27
83	Sara Gardner	Canada	15:28
84	Evette Turner	Jamaica	15:29
85	Tuelo Setswamorago	Botswana	15:30
86	Eliza Cuellar	Mexico	15:32
87	Sameiro Oliveira	Portugal	15:33
88	Zsófia Czene	Hungary	15:35
89	Kristin Cobb	United States	15:37
90	Onkemetse Odumeleng	Botswana	15:41
91	Carmen Naranjo	Ecuador	15:47
92	Gretchen Klein	United States	15:50
93	Michelle Clarke	Jamaica	15:52
94	Lesidi Batoko	Botswana	15:54
95	Szilvia Csoszánszky	Hungary	15:56
96	Alexandra Olarte	Colombia	16:05
97	Ana de Oliveira	Brazil	16:13
98	Tiziana di Crescenzo	Italy	16:19
99	Judit Varga	Hungary	16:23
100	Thalosang Kebafitile	Botswana	16:25
101	Aruna Rani	India	16:26
102	Hong Hsiao-Huei	Chinese Taipei	16:40
103	Korene Hinds	Jamaica	17:52
104	Vidya Deoghare	India	17:58
—	Bhageerathi Bille	India	DNF
—	Angelika Grabianowska	Poland	DNF

==== Teams ====
Rank	Team	Points
1st place, gold medalist(s)	Ethiopia: Gete Wami / 9; Emebet Shiferaw / 11; Genet Gebregiorgis / 17; Kore Alemu / 18; (Askale Bereda) / (34); (Alemitu Bekele) / (79)	55
2nd place, silver medalist(s)	Romania: Elena Cosoveanu / 7; Denisa Costescu / 10; Gabriela Szabo / 20; Ileana Dorca / 22; (Ana Nanu) / (70)	59
3rd place, bronze medalist(s)	Kenya: Lydia Cheromei / 3; Ruth Biwott / 13; Susan Chepkemei / 16; Pamela Chepchumba / 27; (Catherine Kirui) / (59)	59
4	United Kingdom: Paula Radcliffe / 1; Jennifer Clague / 4; Sharon Murphy / 21; Karen Whetton / 35; (Tanya Blake) / (36); (Kerry Mackay) / (55)	61
5	China: Wang Junxia / 2; Zhang Lirong / 8; Zhang Linli / 24; Gu Dongmei / 44	78
6	Japan: Satoko Mizuuchi / 19; Azumi Miyazaki / 23; Keiko Kato / 30; Chiemi Takahashi / 31; (Yoko Yamamoto) / (63); (Akiko Kato) / (80)	103
7	Spain: Ana Gimeno / 29; Rocío Martínez / 33; Marta Domínguez / 37; Mónica Aláez / 66; (Natalia Requena) / (73); (Jacqueline Martín) / (78)	165
8	France: Stéphanie Berthevas / 39; Annie Troussard / 40; Séverine Foulon / 42; Fleur Deconihout / 45; (Cécile Tricot) / (52); (Sylvie Nael) / (57)	166
9	United States: Pamela Hunt / 15; Jennifer Howard / 32; Kim Kelly / 61; Laura Woeller / 62; (Kristin Cobb) / (89); (Gretchen Klein) / (92)	170
10	Italy: Tiziana Alagia / 41; Rosanna Martin / 48; Helga Rauch / 49; Ornella Brion / 53; (Tiziana di Crescenzo) / (98)	191
11	Germany: Dörte Köster / 25; Constanze Effler / 50; Heike Hoffmann / 58; Friederike Schmidt / 60; (Susanne Hornung) / (69)	193
12	Ecuador: Janeth Caizalitín / 6; Sandra Ruales / 38; Soledad Nieto / 72; Carmen Naranjo / 91	207
13	Canada: Kathy Butler / 28; Lindsay McLaren / 46; Nicole Stevenson / 64; Angela Schwan / 71; (Nathalie Bowden) / (82); (Sara Gardner) / (83)	209
14	Poland: Violetta Maron / 43; Renata Borzecka / 67; Anna Jakubczak / 68; Goska Biela / 77; (Angelika Grabianowska) / (DNF)	255
15	Hungary: Mónika Tóth / 56; Renáta Fülöp / 74; Zsófia Czene / 88; Szilvia Csoszánszky / 95; (Judit Varga) / (99)	313
16	Jamaica: Janice Turner / 65; Evette Turner / 84; Michelle Clarke / 93; Korene Hinds / 103	345
17	Botswana: Tuelo Setswamorago / 85; Onkemetse Odumeleng / 90; Lesidi Batoko / 94; Thalosang Kebafitile / 100	369

- Note: Athletes in parentheses did not score for the team result

== Participation ==
An unofficial count yields the participation of 106 athletes from 29 countries in the Junior women's race. This is in agreement with the official numbers as published.

- Australia (3)
- Belgium (1)
- Botswana (4)
- Brazil (1)
- Canada (6)
- China (4)
- Chinese Taipei (1)
- Colombia (1)
- Ecuador (4)
- Ethiopia (6)
- Finland (1)
- France (6)
- Germany (5)
- Hungary (5)
- India (3)
- Israel (1)
- Italy (5)
- Jamaica (4)
- Japan (6)
- Kenya (5)
- Mexico (2)
- Morocco (1)
- Poland (5)
- Portugal (1)
- Romania (5)
- Spain (6)
- Switzerland (2)
- United Kingdom (6)
- United States (6)

== See also ==
- 1992 IAAF World Cross Country Championships – Senior men's race
- 1992 IAAF World Cross Country Championships – Junior men's race
- 1992 IAAF World Cross Country Championships – Senior women's race
