= Luchia Yishak =

Ethiopian long-distance runner

Medal record

Women's athletics

Representing Ethiopia

All-Africa Games
Silver medal – second place	1991 Cairo	3000 m

African Championships
Silver medal – second place	1990 Cairo	3000 m
Bronze medal – third place	1989 Lagos	3000 m
Bronze medal – third place	1992 Belle Vue Maurel	10,000 m

Luchia Yishak (born 8 April 1973 in Eritrea) is a former Ethiopian long-distance runner. She ran for Ethiopia at the Summer Olympics in 1992 and 1996.

She came to prominence as a teenager, winning medals on the track at the African Championships in Athletics and All-Africa Games and reached the 10,000 metres final at the 1991 World Championships in Athletics, finishing 10th. She had a series of high-profile wins on the cross country circuit, finished fourth at the 1990 and 1991 World Cross Country Championships, and won three World Cross Country team medals (1990–92). She made her Olympic debut at the 1992 Barcelona Olympics.

Her international career stalled after this and her next appearances at the 1995 World Championships and 1996 Summer Olympics saw her knocked out in the heats stages. She helped the Ethiopian women to the title at the 1996 IAAF World Road Relay Championships, but that year's appearances were her last on the international stage as the 26-year-old runner's career came to an abrupt end.

== Career ==
Her first major success came at the 1989 African Championships in Athletics, where she claimed the 3000 metres bronze medal. She improved a position to take the silver medal in the event at the 1990 African Championships in Athletics behind Derartu Tulu. Luchia came close to an individual medal at the IAAF World Cross Country Championships in 1990 and 1991, finishing fourth and taking the team silver medal on both occasions. She made her global track debut at the 1991 World Championships in Athletics, where she finished tenth in the 10,000 metres final. The following month she represented Ethiopia at the 1991 All-Africa Games and was the runner-up in the 3000 m behind Susan Sirma.

Luchia performed well on the cross country running circuit in late 1991 to early 1992, taking wins at the Cross Zornotza, Cross de San Sebastián, Cinque Mulini and Almond Blossom Cross Country. These performances contributed to her rank of third place on the IAAF World Cross Challenge series for that season. She was selected for the 1992 IAAF World Cross Country Championships and her tenth-place finish led the Ethiopian women to the bronze medals in the team competition.

On the track later that year, she won the 10,000 m bronze behind Derartu Tulu and Lydia Cheromei at the 1992 African Championships in Athletics. As a result, Luchia was selected to make her Olympic debut at the age of nineteen, running in the 10,000 m at the 1992 Barcelona Olympics. However, she failed to progress beyond the heats stage of the event. She and Fita Bayisa became the first Ethiopians since Mamo Wolde to win at the Cross Internacional Juan Muguerza in January 1993. At the Cross de San Sebastián, Ethiopian duo also took the men's and women's titles, repeating their feats of the previous year. In spite of her performances, she failed to gain a place on the national team for the World Cross Country Championships.

Her next major outing came at the 1995 World Championships in Athletics, although she failed to make it past the 5000 m qualifiers. She experienced a brief resurgence in form in 1996 as she won her first national title in the 5000 m, guaranteeing herself a place on the Olympic team in the process. She also set a career best of 15:22.53 minutes for the event that season. However, the 23-year-old again failed to make it past the heats on the global stage, coming thirteenth in her 5000 m race at the 1996 Summer Olympics in Atlanta.

She ran the anchor leg of the championship record-breaking team at the 1996 IAAF World Road Relay Championships, which she won in a time of 2:16:04 hours, alongside the Ethiopian women's team of Genet Gebregiorgis, Berhane Adere, Ayelech Worku, Gete Wami and Getenesh Urge.

== Competition record ==
Year	Competition	Venue	Position	Notes
1989	African Championships	Lagos, Nigeria	3rd	3000 metres
1990	World Cross Country Championships	Aix-les-Bains, France	4th	Long race
1990	World Cross Country Championships	Aix-les-Bains, France	2nd	Team race
1990	African Championships	Cairo, Egypt	2nd	3000 metres
1991	World Cross Country Championships	Antwerp, Belgium	4th	Long race
1991	World Cross Country Championships	Antwerp, Belgium	2nd	Team race
1991	World Championships	Tokyo, Japan	10th	10,000 m
1991	All-Africa Games	Cairo, Egypt	2nd	3000 m
1992	World Cross Country Championships	Boston, United States	10th	Long race
1992	World Cross Country Championships	Boston, United States	3rd	Team race
1992	African Championships	Belle Vue Maurel, Mauritius	3rd	10,000 m
1992	Olympic Games	Barcelona, Spain	37th (heats)	10,000 m
1995	World Championships	Gothenburg, Sweden	25th (heats)	5000 m
1996	World Road Relay Championships	Copenhagen, Denmark	1st	Ekiden
1996	Olympic Games	Atlanta, United States	39th (heats)	5000 m
