= Martin Bremer (runner) =

German long-distance runner

Martin Bremer (born 19 March 1970) is a German former long-distance runner who competed in distances from 5000 metres to the marathon. He competed in the 1990s and represented Germany twice internationally, running at the 1992 IAAF World Cross Country Championships and taking a 5000 m bronze at the 1994 IAAF World Cup.

Born in Dortmund, he was a member of LG Bayer Leverkusen until the end of 1994, at which point he was banned from the sport for two years after a positive doping test for excess testosterone. In his professional career he ran in several road running competitions. His greatest achievement on the roads was a win at the Frankfurt Marathon, which he did in 1996 in a time of 2:13:38 hours.

== International competitions ==
| Year | Competition | Venue | Position | Event | Notes |
|---|---|---|---|---|---|
| 1992 | IAAF World Cross Country Championships | Boston, United States | 121st | Senior race | 39:24 |
| 1994 | IAAF World Cup | London, United Kingdom | 3rd | 5000 m | 13:33.57 |
