= Madan Singh =

Indian long-distance runner

Madan Singh (born 4 December 1964) is an Indian former long-distance runner who competed up to the marathon distance. He is currently serving in Border Security Force (B.S.F). From the state of Rajasthan, he represented India at 1991 South Asian Games in Colombo and won a silver medal in the 5000 metres.

In the 31st All India Inter-State Athletics Championship in New Delhi in 1993, he came first in the 10,000 metres run with a time of 29:26:00 to post a new meet record that was only beaten 14 years later by Surendra Singh in 2006.

Singh represented India at the IAAF World Cross Country Championships on three occasions, running in 1992, 1993 and 1994.

== International competitions ==
Year	Competition	Venue	Position	Event	Notes
1991	South Asian Games	Colombo, Sri Lanka	2nd	5000 m	
1992	IAAF World Cross Country Championships	Boston, United States	186th	Cross country	42:12
1993	2nd Asian Cross Country Championship	Jakarta, Indonesia	1st	Cross country	
1993	IAAF World Cross Country Championships	Amorebieta, Spain	172nd	Cross country	34:34
1993	World Police and Fire Games	Colorado Springs, United States	1st	5,000 m	
1993	World Police and Fire Games	Colorado Springs, United States	2nd	10,000 m	
1994	IAAF World Cross Country Championships	Budapest, Hungary	226th	Cross country	38:48
1995	World Police and Fire Games	Melbourne, Australia	1st	3000 m steeplechase	
1995	World Police and Fire Games	Melbourne, Australia	2nd	10,000 m	
1995	World Police and Fire Games	Melbourne, Australia	3rd	5000 m	
