= 2000 Asian Athletics Championships – Women's 5000 metres =

The women's 5000 metres event at the 2000 Asian Athletics Championships was held in Jakarta, Indonesia on 31 August.

== Results ==
Rank	Name	Nationality	Time	Notes
1st place, gold medalist(s)	Wu Quingdong	China	15:58.83	
2nd place, silver medalist(s)	Naomi Sakashita	Japan	16:01.53	
3rd place, bronze medalist(s)	Supriati Sutono	Indonesia	16:03.85	
4	Aruna Devi Laishram	India	17:09.22	
5	Pushpa Devi	India	17:15.56	
6	Zhou Chunxiu	China	17:37.14	
7	Huang In-Ping	Chinese Taipei	17:47.10	
8	Lee Cho-Ae	South Korea	18:22.39	
9	Cristabel Martes	Philippines	18:37.61	
10	Baatarhuu Battsetseg	Mongolia	18:52.78	
	Chan Man Yee	Hong Kong	DNF	
