= Dennis Høegh =

Danish footballer (born 1989)

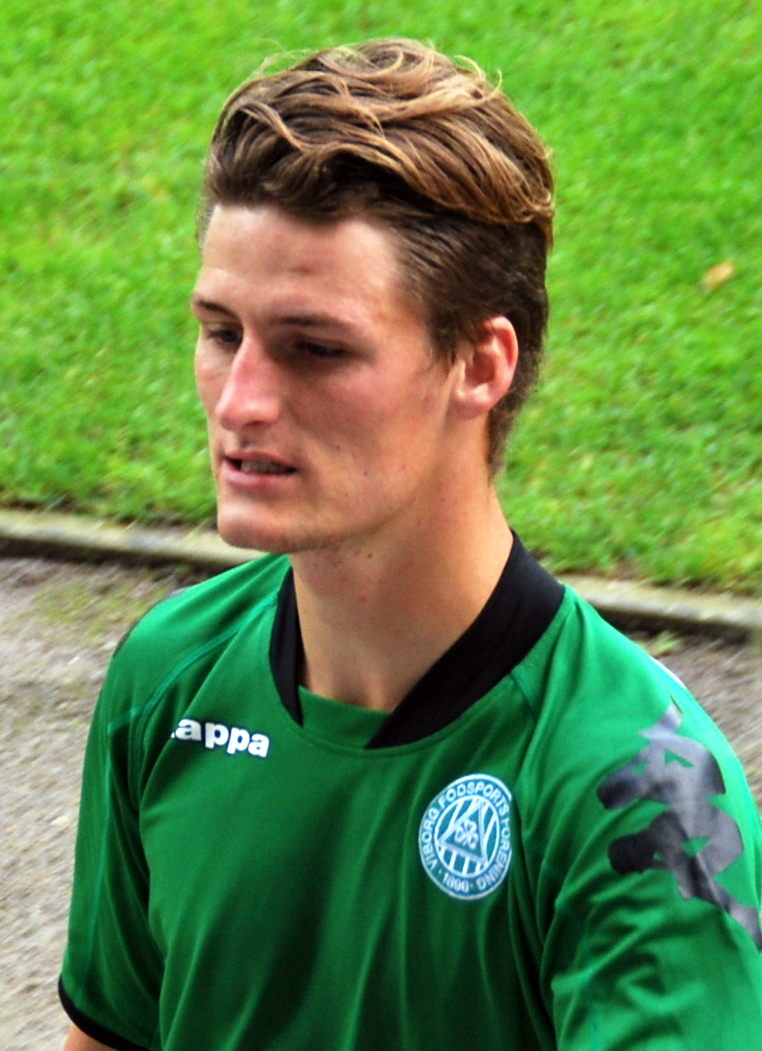
- Dennis Høegh in May 2011.

Personal information
- Date of birth: 21 February 1989 (age 37)
- Place of birth: Ryomgård, Denmark
- Height: 1.83 m (6 ft 0 in)
- Position: Midfielder

Youth career
- 199?–2001: Midtdjurs
- 2001–2007: AGF

Senior career*
Years	Team	Apps	(Gls)
2007–2010	AGF	13	(2)
2011–2012	Viborg	23	(3)
2013–2015	Hobro	32	(3)
2015–2021	Fredericia	161	(21)

International career
2005	Denmark U16	3	(0)
2004–2006	Denmark U17	23	(3)
2006	Denmark U18	4	(1)
2006–2008	Denmark U19	14	(0)
2007–2008	Denmark U20	4	(0)
2009	Denmark U21	1	(0)
- * Club domestic league appearances and goals as of 17:55, 29 June 2021 (UTC)

Dennis Høegh (born 21 February 1989) is a Danish professional footballer who plays as a midfielder.

== Career ==
He has played 49 games and scored four goals for various Danish youth national teams, including one game for the Denmark national under-21 football team.

He has been playing at AGF since he was 12 years old, hailing from one of AGF's feeder clubs, IF Midtdjurs. He has been in teams above his age class since joining AGF. At a U16 cup he was voted the best technical player, and he has been attending trials at English giants, Chelsea and Bolton Wanderers, and at Italian giant Inter, with Chelsea touting him as one of the two best Danish player in his generation.

He made his senior debut in the Danish Cup in August 2007, and made his Superliga debut in October 2007.
