= Kim Østergaard Nielsen =

Danish footballer (born 1974)

Personal information
- Date of birth: 20 October 1974 (age 52)
- Place of birth: Aarhus, Denmark
- Height: 1.82 m (6 ft 0 in)
- Position: Right-back

Youth career
- IF Fuglebakken
- AGF
- –1995: Silkeborg
- 1995–1996: Randers Freja

Senior career*
Years	Team	Apps	(Gls)
1996–1998	Aarhus Fremad	9	(0)
1998–2005	Randers FC (Note: Randers Freja changed its name to Randers FC in 2003.)	78	(1)
- * Club domestic league appearances and goals

Kim Østergaard Nielsen (born 20 October 1974) is a Danish former professional footballer who played as a right-back. During his career, he played professionally for Aarhus Fremad and Randers FC.

== Career ==
Nielsen graduated from the Randers Freja youth academy in 1996, where he moved to Aarhus Fremad who were competing in the second tier Danish 1st Division. In his first season at the club, Fremad sensationally won promotion to the Danish Superliga. He made his professional debut at the highest level on 25 July 1997 in a 2–1 derby win over AGF.

Nielsen returned to Randers in 1998, competing in the second tier. He won promotion to the Superliga with Randers during the 2003–04 season, and his return to the top tier came on 1 August 2004 as a late substitute for Rene Carlsen in a 1–0 home loss to Herfølge Boldklub. He made a total of 32 league appearances that season, which saw Randers suffer relegation to the 1st Division after finishing bottom of the league. He retired after his final game, a 2–2 draw against Esbjerg fB on 19 June 2005.

== Style of play ==
Nielsen was described by Randers FC's assistant coach Peter Elstrup as "an elegant and intelligent footballer. As a person, he was a good and smart guy who left a positive mark on the squad".

== After football ==
As of May 2020, Nielsen works as Country Customer Manager for IKEA. He has not played football since, mainly focusing on a yearly participation in the Berlin Marathon.
