= Mads Jørgensen =

Danish footballer (born 1979)

Personal information
- Full name: Lars Mads Jørgensen
- Date of birth: 10 February 1979 (age 47)
- Place of birth: Ryomgård, Denmark
- Height: 1.82 m (6 ft 0 in)
- Position: Midfielder

Team information
- Current team: Molde (scout)

Youth career
- 198?–1989: IF Midtdjurs
- 1989–1998: AGF

Senior career*
Years	Team	Apps	(Gls)
1998–2001	AGF	95	(14)
2001–2003	Brøndby	50	(16)
2003–2004	Ancona	0	(0)
2004–2005	Stabæk	19	(3)
2005–2007	Brøndby	42	(5)
2007–2008	AGF	2	(0)
Total		208	(38)

International career
1996–1998	Denmark U19	5	(0)
1998–2001	Denmark U21	15	(1)
2001	Denmark	1	(0)

Managerial career
- 2011–2024: Liverpool (scout)
- 2016–2023: Brøndby (scout)
- 2025–: Molde (scout)
- * Club domestic league appearances and goals

Lars Mads Jørgensen (born 10 February 1979) is a Danish former professional footballer who played as an attacking midfielder and won two Danish Superliga championships and two Danish Cup trophies with Brøndby IF. He started his career with AGF, before moving to Brøndby, and afterwards abroad to play for Italian club Ancona and Norwegian side Stabæk. He earned one cap for the Denmark national team.

He is the younger brother of former Danish national team player Martin Jørgensen.

== Career ==
Born in Ryomgård, Jørgensen started his career at local club AGF in the top-flight Danish Superliga championship. He was selected for the Danish under-19 national team in September 1996, and signed a three-year contract with AGF in September 1997. He made his senior debut for AGF in March 1998 and made almost 100 league appearances for the club. When his contract ran out in the summer 2001, he left AGF on a free transfer. With his older brother Martin Jørgensen playing for Italian club Udinese, Mads Jørgensen was reportedly on his way to a number of Italian clubs, and he was dubbed "Jørgensen Jr." by the Italian sports press. Mads Jørgensen decided to stay in Denmark, moving to league rivals Brøndby IF. Despite his status as a free agent, he demanded that Brøndby pay AGF DKK 1 million in compensation, before signing a two-year contract in June 2001.

His first time at Brøndby was a success, as he scored ten goals in his first season and helped the club win the 2001–02 Danish Superliga. Having played 15 matches and scored one goal for the Denmark under-21 national team since December 1998, he made his debut for the senior Danish national team against Iceland in October 2001. Scoring the last goal of the 2003 Danish Cup final, he helped Brøndby win 3–0 against FC Midtjylland and secure the Danish Cup trophy. In the summer of 2003, Jørgensen's contract with Brøndby expired, making him a free agent.

In July 2003, Jørgensen moved to Ancona in the Italian Serie A, but his stay was short. Brøndby manager Per Bjerregaard initially refused to let Jørgensen play until Ancona paid a DKK 1 million compensation. When cleared to play, injuries ruined his stay at the club. Jørgensen never made any appearances for Ancona, before moving to Stabæk Fotball in the Norwegian Premier League in the spring of 2004. At Stabæk, Jørgensen looked to replace Norwegian international midfielder Martin Andresen, and he scored two goals in his debut match; a 3–1 win against Sogndal. As Stabæk suffered relegation to Adeccoligaen at the end of the season, Jørgensen looked to leave the club.

He returned to Brøndby IF in March 2005. Playing the last half of the 2004–05 season, he helped the club complete the Double in 2005, winning both Superliga and Danish Cup titles that year. Jørgensen suffered a string of injuries from the start of the 2005–06 season, leaving him with little playing time. He moved back to childhood club AGF in 2007. In June 2008, he ended his professional career due to persistent injuries.

== Post-retirement ==
In 2011, Jørgensen was hired as a scout for Liverpool responsible for Scandinavia. Between 2016 and 2023 Jørgensen also worked for Brøndby IF as a scout, while also working for Liverpool.

After 14 and a half years in Liverpool, it was confirmed in January 2025 that Jørgensen had been hired as a scout in Molde FK.

== Honours ==
Brøndby

- Danish Superliga: 2001–02, 2004–05
- Danish Cup: 2002–03, 2004–05
