= 1992 IAAF World Cross Country Championships =

- Organisers: IAAF
- Edition: 20th
- Date: March 21
- Host city: Boston, Massachusetts, United States
- Venue: Franklin Park
- Events: 4
- Distances: 12.53 km – Senior men 7.8 km – Junior men 6.37 km – Senior women 4.005 km – Junior women
- Participation: 580 athletes from 53 nations

The 1992 IAAF World Cross Country Championships was held in Boston, Massachusetts, United States, at the Franklin Park on March 21, 1992. A report on the event was given in The New York Times.

Complete results for senior men, junior men, senior women, junior women, medallists, and the results of British athletes were published.

== Medallists ==
Event	Gold		Silver		Bronze	
Individual
Senior men (12.53 km)	John Ngugi; Kenya	37:05	William Mutwol; Kenya	37:17	Fita Bayissa; Ethiopia	37:18
Junior men (7.8 km)	Ismael Kirui; Kenya	23:27	Haile Gebrselassie; Ethiopia	23:35	Josephat Machuka; Kenya	23:37
Senior women (6.37 km)	Lynn Jennings; United States	21:16	Catherina McKiernan; Ireland	21:18	Albertina Dias; Portugal	21:19
Junior women (4.005 km)	Paula Radcliffe; United Kingdom	13:30	Wang Junxia; China	13:35	Lydia Cheromei; Kenya	13:43
Team
Senior men	Kenya	46	France	145	United Kingdom	147
Junior men	Kenya	18	Ethiopia	28	Japan	90
Senior women	Kenya	47	United States	77	Ethiopia	96
Junior women	Ethiopia	55	Romania	59	Kenya	59

== Race results ==
=== Senior men's race (12.53 km) ===
Individual race
Rank	Athlete	Country	Time
1st place, gold medalist(s)	John Ngugi	Kenya	37:05
2nd place, silver medalist(s)	William Mutwol	Kenya	37:17
3rd place, bronze medalist(s)	Fita Bayissa	Ethiopia	37:18
4	Khalid Skah	Morocco	37:20
5	Richard Chelimo	Kenya	37:21
6	Steve Moneghetti	Australia	37:23
7	Dominic Kirui	Kenya	37:26
8	William Sigei	Kenya	37:27
9	Thierry Pantel	France	37:30
10	Bruno Le Stum	France	37:33
11	Domingos Castro	Portugal	37:35
12	Antonio Martins	France	37:37
Full results

Teams
Rank	Team	Points
1st place, gold medalist(s)	Kenya: John Ngugi / 1; William Mutwol / 2; Richard Chelimo / 5; Dominic Kirui / 7; William Sigei / 8; Ondoro Osoro / 23; (Sammy Lelei) / (77)	46
2nd place, silver medalist(s)	France: Thierry Pantel / 9; Bruno Le Stum / 10; Antonio Martins / 12; Pascal Thiébaut / 21; Jean-Louis Prianon / 45; Antonio Rapisarda / 48; (Pascal Fetizon) / (173); (Paul Arpin) / (DNF); (Mickael Dufermont) / (DNF)	145
3rd place, bronze medalist(s)	United Kingdom: Richard Nerurkar / 15; Eamonn Martin / 17; Dave Clarke / 20; Andy Bristow / 26; Paul Dugdale / 33; Mark Dalloway / 36; (Paul Roden) / (85); (Tommy Murray) / (104); (Chris Robison) / (115)	147
4	Spain	171
5	Italy	246
6	Morocco	247
7	Portugal	249
8	United States	263
Full results

- Note: Athletes in parentheses did not score for the team result

=== Junior men's race (7.8 km) ===
Individual race
Rank	Athlete	Country	Time
1st place, gold medalist(s)	Ismael Kirui	Kenya	23:27
2nd place, silver medalist(s)	Haile Gebrselassie	Ethiopia	23:35
3rd place, bronze medalist(s)	Josephat Machuka	Kenya	23:37
4	Josephat Kiprono N'Deti	Kenya	23:45
5	Tegenu Abebe	Ethiopia	23:50
6	Francis Nade	Tanzania	23:54
7	Yasuyuki Watanabe	Japan	23:58
8	Gerbaba Eticha	Ethiopia	24:16
9	Antony Mwingereza	Tanzania	24:19
10	Samuel Otieno	Kenya	24:20
11	Mark Kipsang Too	Kenya	24:22
12	Kazuhiro Kawauchi	Japan	24:23
Full results

Teams
Rank	Team	Points
1st place, gold medalist(s)	Kenya: Ismael Kirui / 1; Josephat Machuka / 3; Josephat Kiprono N'Deti / 4; Samuel Otieno / 10; (Mark Kipsang Too) / (11)	18
2nd place, silver medalist(s)	Ethiopia: Haile Gebrselassie / 2; Tegenu Abebe / 5; Gerbaba Eticha / 8; Tesgie Legesse / 13	28
3rd place, bronze medalist(s)	Japan: Yasuyuki Watanabe / 7; Kazuhiro Kawauchi / 12; Masaki Yamamoto / 32; Daisuke Isomatsu / 39; (Ryoji Maeda) / (42); (Shigekazu Taguchi) / (49)	90
4	Morocco	103
5	Italy	128
6	United Kingdom	135
7	Tanzania	135
8	Spain	149
Full results

- Note: Athletes in parentheses did not score for the team result

=== Senior women's race (6.37 km) ===
Individual race
Rank	Athlete	Country	Time
1st place, gold medalist(s)	Lynn Jennings	United States	21:16
2nd place, silver medalist(s)	Catherina McKiernan	Ireland	21:18
3rd place, bronze medalist(s)	Albertina Dias	Portugal	21:19
4	Vicki Huber	United States	21:34
5	Nadia Dandolo	Italy	21:35
6	Qu Yunxia	China	21:36
7	Sonia O'Sullivan	Ireland	21:37
8	Jill Hunter	United Kingdom	21:39
9	Susan Sirma	Kenya	21:40
10	Luchia Yeshak	Ethiopia	21:42
11	Hellen Kimaiyo	Kenya	21:45
12	Jane Ngotho	Kenya	21:47
Full results

Teams
Rank	Team	Points
1st place, gold medalist(s)	Kenya: Susan Sirma / 9; Hellen Kimaiyo / 11; Jane Ngotho / 12; Hellen Chepngeno / 15; (Pauline Konga) / (90)	47
2nd place, silver medalist(s)	United States: Lynn Jennings / 1; Vicki Huber / 4; Annette Peters / 30; Sylvia Mosqueda / 42; (Melinda Schmidt) / (47); (Lisa Karnopp) / (89)	77
3rd place, bronze medalist(s)	Ethiopia: Luchia Yeshak / 10; Merima Denboba / 20; Getenesh Urge / 28; Berhane Adere / 38; (Tigist Moreda) / (DNF); (Derartu Tulu) / (DNF)	96
4	Ireland	103
5	Portugal	115
6	Romania	129
7	United Kingdom	129
8	Spain	138
Full results

- Note: Athletes in parentheses did not score for the team result

=== Junior women's race (4.005 km) ===
Individual race
Rank	Athlete	Country	Time
1st place, gold medalist(s)	Paula Radcliffe	United Kingdom	13:30
2nd place, silver medalist(s)	Wang Junxia	China	13:35
3rd place, bronze medalist(s)	Lydia Cheromei	Kenya	13:43
4	Jennifer Clague	United Kingdom	13:44
5	Anja Smolders	Belgium	13:58
6	Janeth Caizalitín	Ecuador	14:00
7	Elena Cosoveanu	Romania	14:02
8	Zhang Lirong	China	14:03
9	Gete Wami	Ethiopia	14:04
10	Denisa Costescu	Romania	14:05
11	Emebet Shiferaw	Ethiopia	14:06
12	Susie Power	Australia	14:06
Full results

Teams
Rank	Team	Points
1st place, gold medalist(s)	Ethiopia: Gete Wami / 9; Emebet Shiferaw / 11; Genet Gebregiorgis / 17; Kore Alemu / 18; (Askale Bereda) / (34); (Alemitu Bekele) / (79)	55
2nd place, silver medalist(s)	Romania: Elena Cosoveanu / 7; Denisa Costescu / 10; Gabriela Szabo / 20; Ileana Dorca / 22; (Ana Nanu) / (70)	59
3rd place, bronze medalist(s)	Kenya: Lydia Cheromei / 3; Ruth Biwott / 13; Susan Chepkemei / 16; Pamela Chepchumba / 27; (Catherine Kirui) / (59)	59
4	United Kingdom	61
5	China	78
6	Japan	103
7	Spain	165
8	France	166
Full results

- Note: Athletes in parentheses did not score for the team result

== Medal table (unofficial) ==
* Host nation (United States)

Rank	Nation	Gold	Silver	Bronze	Total
1	Kenya	5	1	3	9
2	Ethiopia	1	2	2	5
3	United States*	1	1	0	2
4	Great Britain	1	0	1	2
5	China	0	1	0	1
5	France	0	1	0	1
5	Ireland	0	1	0	1
5	Romania	0	1	0	1
9	Japan	0	0	1	1
9	Portugal	0	0	1	1
Totals (10 entries)		8	8	8	24

- Note: Totals include both individual and team medals, with medals in the team competition counting as one medal.

== Participation ==
An unofficial count yields the participation of 580 athletes from 53 countries. This is in agreement with the official numbers as published.

- Algeria (7)
- Argentina (9)
- Australia (17)
- Belgium (12)
- Bermuda (2)
- Botswana (4)
- Brazil (19)
- Burundi (2)
- Canada (26)
- China (6)
- Chinese Taipei (3)
- Colombia (4)
- Commonwealth of Independent States (12)
- Costa Rica (4)
- Cyprus (7)
- Czechoslovakia (1)
- Denmark (8)
- Ecuador (6)
- Ethiopia (25)
- Fiji (7)
- Finland (5)
- France (27)
- Germany (20)
- Hong Kong (2)
- Hungary (5)
- Iceland (4)
- India (19)
- Indonesia (6)
- Ireland (21)
- Israel (4)
- Italy (23)
- Jamaica (10)
- Japan (24)
- Kenya (22)
- Lithuania (5)
- Mauritius (3)
- Mexico (13)
- Morocco (17)
- Netherlands (14)
- New Zealand (4)
- Norway (2)
- Peru (1)
- Poland (8)
- Portugal (17)
- Romania (10)
- Rwanda (1)
- Spain (27)
- Switzerland (14)
- Tanzania (10)
- United Kingdom (27)
- United States (27)
- Venezuela (1)
- Zimbabwe (6)

== See also ==
- 1992 IAAF World Cross Country Championships – Senior men's race
- 1992 IAAF World Cross Country Championships – Junior men's race
- 1992 IAAF World Cross Country Championships – Senior women's race
- 1992 IAAF World Cross Country Championships – Junior women's race
- 1992 in athletics (track and field)
