= Naomi Sakashita =

Japanese long-distance runner

Medal record

Women's athletics

Representing Japan

Asian Championships
Silver medal – second place	2000 Jakarta	5000 m

Naomi Sakashita (Japanese: 坂下奈穂美; born 25 May 1975) is a retired Japanese runner who specialized in the 5000 metres and marathon.

Sakashita won the 5000 metres at the 1994 Asian Junior Championships, the bronze medal in half marathon at the 1997 East Asian Games, and the silver medal in the 5000 metres at the 2000 Asian Championships.

At the 1995 World Cross Country Championships Sakashita finished 31st in the senior race and ended fourth in the team competition. She finished sixteenth at the 1995 World Half Marathon Championships; sixth in the team competition. She won a bronze medal at the 1996 World Road Relay Championships.

Sakashita's personal best times were 15:28.99 minutes in the 5000 metres, achieved in May 2000 in Nobeoka; 32:53.40 minutes in the 10,000 metres, achieved in May 1996 in Mito; 1:10:17 hours in the half marathon, achieved in August 1997 in Shibetsu; and 2:28:09 hours in the marathon, achieved in March 2001 in Nagoya.
