= Josephat Machuka =

Kenyan long-distance runner

Personal information
- Born: December 12, 1975 (age 50)
Medal record
Men's athletics
Representing Kenya
African Championships
| Gold medal – first place | 1992 Belle Vue Harel | 10,000 m |
| Bronze medal – third place | 1992 Belle Vue Harel | 5000 m |

Josephat Machuka (also known as Josephat Machuka Kiprono or Josephat Makworo Machuka; born 12 December 1975) (Note: Though World Athletics' database lists a birthdate of 12 December 1973, a 2021 interview stated he was born on Jamhuri Day (12 December) in 1975.) is a Kenyan long-distance runner. He won IAAF World Cross Country Championships junior bronze medal in 1992 and 1993. In the 1996 IAAF World Cross Country Championships he was 10th and was part of the Kenyan team that won team gold.

At the 1992 World Junior Championships he competed in the 10,000 metres finishing second, but as he was being passed just before the finish, he deliberately punched the eventual winner Haile Gebrselassie during the final sprint and was disqualified. Overshadowed by Gebrselassie his entire career, this early incident is what Machuka is best remembered for.

He competed at the 1996 Atlanta Olympics, finishing fifth in the men's 10,000 metres race, won by Haile Gebrselassie.

He was also fifth in the 1995 World Championships 10,000 metres race. He won the Eurocross meeting in Luxembourg in 1998.

Machuka was also a successful road runner. He won the Bloomsday Run in 1994 and 1995. Machuka won the Steamboat Classic 4-mile race in 1995. In the Netherlands he won the Zevenheuvelenloop (a 15 kilometres race) twice, in 1995 and 1996, just as the Dam tot Damloop, in 1993 and 1996.

Machuka's career was cut short due to a road accident in 1998. He later became a businessman and farmer.

He is not to be confused with Josephat Kiprono, a Kenyan marathon runner born in 1973 who he raced at the 1996 Zevenheuvelenloop; or Josephat Kiprono N'Deti (born 1 April 1973), who competed at the 1991 World Cross Country U20 race and raced against Machuka at the 1992 World Cross Country U20 race under the name "Josephat Kiprono". Machuka competed at the 1992, 1993, and 1996 World Cross Country Championships but did not compete at the 1991 edition, and did not record major marathon finishes.

== International competitions ==
| Year | Competition | Venue | Position | Event | Notes |
Representing Kenya
| 1992 | World Cross Country Championships | Boston, United States | 3rd | Junior Race (7.8 km) | 23:37 |
| 1992 | African Championships | Belle Vue Maurel, Mauritius | 3rd | 5000 m | 13:28.85 |
| 1992 | African Championships | Belle Vue Maurel, Mauritius | 1st | 10,000 m | 27:59.70 |
| 1992 | World Junior Championships | Seoul, South Korea | — | 10,000m | DQ |
| 1993 | World Cross Country Championships | Amorebieta, Spain | 3rd | Junior Race (7.15 km) | 20:23 |
| 1995 | All-Africa Games | Harare, Zimbabwe | 1st | 5000 m | 13:31.11 |
| 1995 | All-Africa Games | Harare, Zimbabwe | 1st | 10,000 m | 28:03.6 |
| 1995 | World Championships | Gothenburg, Sweden | 5th | 10,000 m | 27:23.72 |
| 1996 | World Cross Country Championships | Stellenbosch, South Africa | 10th | Long Race (12.15 km) | 34:37 |
| 1996 | World Cross Country Championships | Stellenbosch, South Africa | 1st | Team Race | 33 pts |
| 1996 | Summer Olympics | Atlanta, United States | 5th | 10,000 m | 27:35.08 |
