= Kenjiro Jitsui =

Japanese long-distance runner

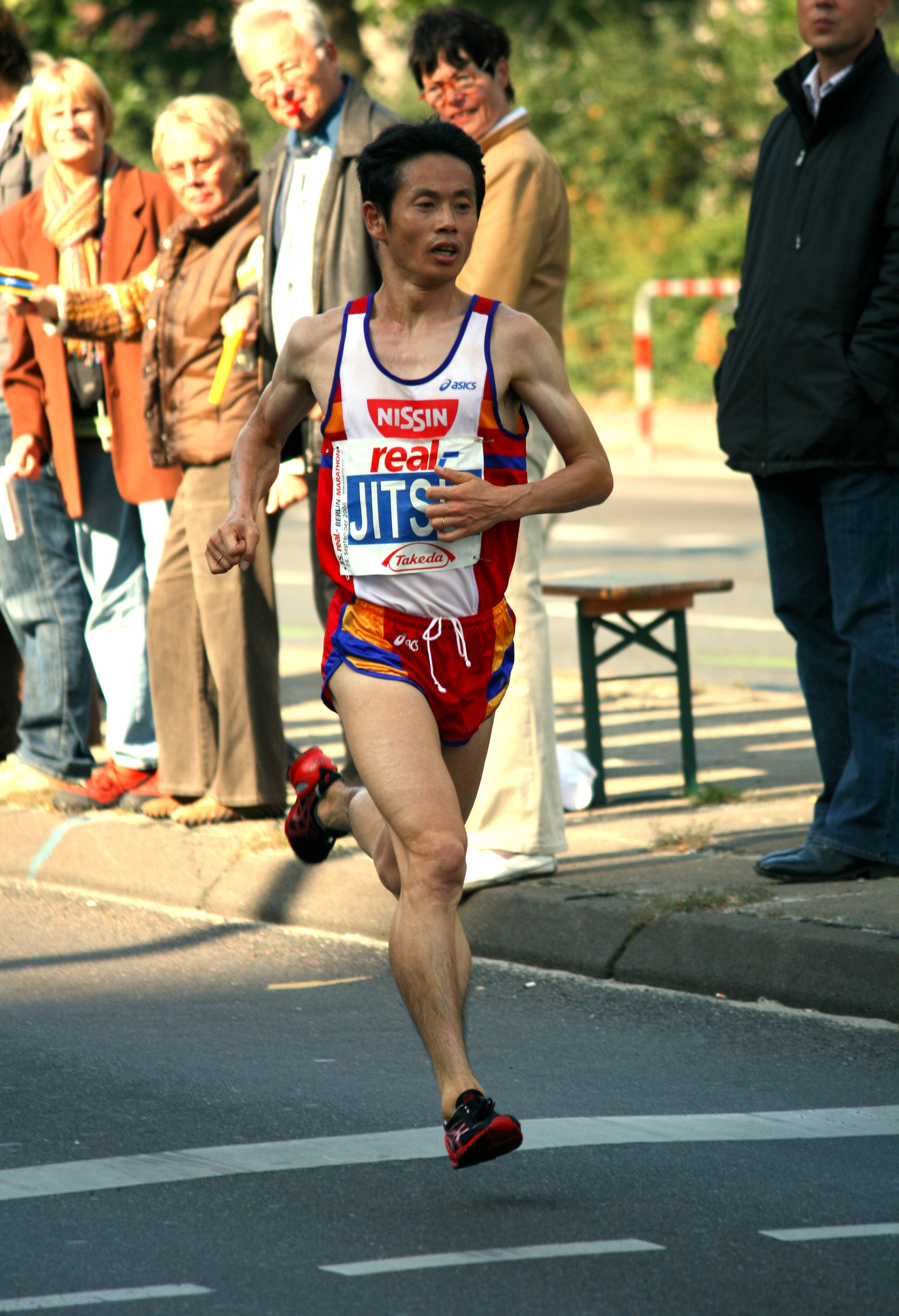
- Kenjiro Jitsui in 2008

Personal information
- Nationality: Japanese
- Born: 16 December 1968 (age 57) Tajimi, Gifu Prefecture, Japan

Sport
- Sport: Long-distance running
- Event: Marathon
Medal record
Representing Japan
Summer Universiade
Silver medal – second place	1991 Sheffield	Marathon

Kenjiro Jitsui (born 16 December 1968) is a Japanese long-distance runner. He competed in the men's marathon at the 1996 Summer Olympics.
