= Vicki Huber =

Athletics competitor

Personal information
- Nickname: "Coach Mom"
- Nationality: American
- Born: May 29, 1967 (age 59) Wilmington, Delaware

Sport
- Country: United States
- Sport: Athletics
- Events: Middle distance running (1500, 3000, 5000 m), Cross country running
- College team: Villanova University
- Now coaching: Sun Valley High School: Track and Field

Achievements and titles
- Personal bests: 1500 m: 4:07.40 (1988) 3000 m: 8:37.25 (1988); 5000 m: 15:34.94 (1996) 5 K (road): 15:14 (1992, NR)

Vicki Huber (born May 29, 1967) is a retired American middle distance and cross country runner.

== Early life and early education ==
Vicki Huber was born on May 29, 1967, in Wilmington, Delaware. Huber attended Concord High School where she began running as conditioning for field hockey. Concord's coach, Joe McNichol, recalled seeing Huber as "el Caballo", a reference to Alberto Juantorena, a Cuban Olympic champion. McNichol said that she "ran exactly like" Juantorena and that she was "a real thoroughbred." Huber won five state titles as a prep athlete, setting state records in the 800 and 1600 meters.

== College career ==
After graduating from high school, Huber attended Villanova University, where she continued her running career. Huber struggled at first due to the intensity of the training program. At the time, Villanova coach Marty Stern thought that Huber "was a wimp" and hoped "she'd leave and go home." Although she won the 1986 Big East Conference championship in the 3000 meters, she did not qualify for the NCAA track and field championships. In the fall of 1986, Huber finished 29th at the NCAA cross country championships. Huber had a breakthrough during the 1987 indoor and outdoor track seasons, winning her first NCAA championships. She won the NCAA indoor championship in the 3000 meters. Huber entered the NCAA outdoor championships as the favorite to win the 3000 meters, and she did just that, winning in a meet record time of 8:54.41. That fall, she finished 9th at the NCAA cross country championships.

Huber's success continued in 1988. She won NCAA indoor championships in the 1500 and 3000 meters. At the NCAA outdoor track and field championships, Huber successfully defended her title in the 3000 meters, finishing in a collegiate-record time of 8:47.35. She then competed in the 1500 meters at the USA Outdoor Track and Field Championships, winning in a time of 4:07.40. Following these victories, Huber attempted to qualify for the Summer Olympics in the 3000 meters. At the Olympic Trials, she faced a field which included American record-holder Mary Slaney. Huber ran with the pack at the beginning of the race before making a move with 1200 meters left. She caught Slaney with 800 meters to go, but Slaney's finishing speed was too much for Huber to overcome. Despite this, Huber finished 2nd with a time of 8:46.48, earning her a spot on the US team in Seoul. At the Olympics, Huber finished 6th in the 3000 meters with a time of 8:37.25. She ran a competitive race, taking the lead with 800 meters left, but she ended up eight seconds out of medal position.

In 1989, Huber again won indoor and outdoor NCAA championships in the 3000 meters. Rather than go to Europe and run professionally during the summer, which would have ended her collegiate eligibility, Huber decided to return to Villanova for one final cross country season. She explained that she "owed it to Villanova" and that the time would be better spent resting and training. In the last race of her collegiate career, Huber won the NCAA cross country championship and led Villanova to a team title. She finished her career with eight NCAA championships.

While at Villanova, she won the Broderick Award (now the Honda Sports Award) as the nation's best female collegiate track and field athlete in both 1988 and 1989.

== Later career ==
During the next few seasons, Huber dealt with a number of injuries and illnesses, including back and pelvis injuries in 1990, a stress fracture in 1991, and an Achilles tendon injury in 1994. She had some success, however, finishing fourth at the 1992 IAAF World Cross Country Championships and setting an American road record for the 5K.

After giving birth to a daughter in May 1995, Huber began training again, with the goal of qualifying for the 1996 Olympics. She said, "[after giving birth], I got this fire back in me." She had several impressive results in the months leading up to the Trials, including a time in the 1500 meters that was less than a second off her best. Going into the Trials, she was ranked second in the 1500 meters and fifth in the 5000 meters. At the 1996 Olympic Trials, Huber did not finish her heat in the 5000 meters. She was in third place, only needing to finish in the top five to qualify for the finals, when she dropped out of the race. After the race, she said she felt tired, dehydrated, and sick. Her coach, Dick Brown, described Huber as "absolutely devastated" by her performance. Despite this, he asked her if she wanted to run in the 1500 meters, and with the encouragement of a friend, Huber decided to attempt to qualify in that race. Brown told her, "Stay in fourth or fifth place, and if someone moves, try to cover the move." Huber was in fourth place late in the race when she began catching up to Amy Wickus, passing Wickus with only thirty meters left in the race. Huber finished in third place with a time of 4:11.23, earning her a spot on the US team for the Olympics in Atlanta. In the month leading up to the Olympics, Huber's training was limited due to a sore Achilles tendon. At the Olympics, Huber failed to qualify for the semifinals in the 1500 meters.

== Honors and awards ==
She was inducted into the Delaware Track & Field Hall of Fame in 2001 and the Delaware Sports Museum and Hall of Fame in 2002.
