= IF Midtdjurs =

Danish football club

- Full name: Idrætsforeningen Midtdjurs Fodbold
- Founded: 17 January 1972; 53 years ago
- Ground: Ryomgård Stadium; Ryomgård, Denmark
- Chairman: Lars Norman Thomsen
- Manager: Rasmus Brasch
- League: Series 2 (VIII)
- Website: http://www.ifm-fodbold.dk/
Home colours

Idrætsforeningen Midtdjurs Fodbold, also known as IF Midtdjurs, is an association football club based in Ryomgård, Djursland Denmark, that competes in the Series 2, the eighth tier of the Danish football league system and the third tier of the regional DBU Jutland governing body.

The club was established in 1972 as a merger between Ryomgård Idrætsforening og Nimtofte Gymnastikforening.

The club most famously had Martin Jørgensen as a youth player during the 1980s, who would later have a prolific career in AGF, Udinese and Fiorentina. Other former players include Mads Jørgensen, Dennis Høegh and Rasmus Grønborg Hansen.
