= Ethel Hudzon =

Indonesian athlete (born 1968)

Personal information
- Nationality: Indonesian
- Born: 1 February 1968 (age 58)

Sport
- Sport: Long-distance running
- Event: Marathon

Ethel Hudzon (born 1 February 1968) is an Indonesian former long-distance runner. He competed in the men's marathon at the 1996 Summer Olympics.
