= Paolo Donati =

Italian long-distance runner

Personal information
- Nationality: Italian
- Born: 22 January 1962 (age 64)

Sport
- Country: Italy
- Sport: Athletics
- Event: Long-distance running

Achievements and titles
- Personal best: 10,000 m: 28:06.70 (1994)

Paolo Donati (born 22 January 1962) is a former Italian male long-distance runner who competed at three editions of the IAAF World Cross Country Championships at senior level (1992, 1993, 1994). He won one national championships at senior level (10,000 metres: 1992).
