= Enrico Vivian =

Italian long-distance runner

Personal information
- Nationality: Italian
- Born: 22 July 1968 (age 57)

Sport
- Country: Italy
- Sport: Athletics
- Event: Long-distance running

Achievements and titles
- Personal best: 10,000 m: 28:54.64 (1992)

Enrico Vivian (born 22 July 1968) is a former Italian male long-distance runner who competed at one edition of the IAAF World Cross Country Championships at senior level (1992).
