= Rene Carlsen =

Danish footballer (born 1979)

Personal information
- Full name: Rene Skovgaard Carlsen
- Date of birth: 30 September 1979 (age 47)
- Place of birth: Denmark
- Height: 1.76 m (5 ft 9 in)
- Position: Left-back

Youth career
- IF Midtdjurs
- IK Skovbakken

Senior career*
Years	Team	Apps	(Gls)
–2003	Vorup FB		
2003–2006	Randers	65	(0)
2007–2009	Valur	32	(1)
2009–2010	Fredericia	2	(0)
- * Club domestic league appearances and goals

Rene Skovgaard Carlsen (born 30 September 1979) is a Danish former professional footballer who played as a left-back. During his career, he played professionally for Randers FC and Valur.

== Career ==
Carlsen made his breakthrough as part of Vorup FB who were competing in the lower tier Jutland Series, before moving to newly formed Randers FC in 2003. (Note: Randers Freja changed its name to Randers FC in 2003.) He won promotion to the Danish Superliga with Randers during the 2003–04 season, and made his professional debut in the top tier on 1 August 2004 starting in a 1–0 home loss to Herfølge Boldklub, before coming off in the 76th minute for Kim Østergaard Nielsen. He made a total of 23 league appearances that season, which saw Randers suffer relegation to the 1st Division after finishing bottom of the league.

After relegation, Carlsen was often injured and moved down the depth chart as Peter Christiansen was preferred at left-back by head coach Lars Olsen. On 25 September 2006, it was announced that Carlsen would move to Icelandic club Valur as his contract expired on 1 January 2007. He made his European debut for Valur as they lost 2–0 to Cork City on 23 June 2007 in the UEFA Intertoto Cup first round. The following season he also made his first UEFA Champions League appearance in a 2–0 first-round away loss to BATE Borisov on 25 July 2008.

Carlsen returned to Denmark in January 2009, signing with Danish 1st Division club Fredericia after a successful trial. He retired in 2010, where he began coaching ninth tier club TMG from Mårslet.

== Style of play ==
Carlsen was described by former Randers FC's teammate Christian Kemph as "aggressive" and "not afraid of going forward". Despite lacking top-level speed, he compensated with good positioning and a fine skillset which made him a strong crosser of the ball.

== After football ==
After his retirement from football, Carlsen coached at lower level and played amateur football while residing in Aarhus. He finished his training as a carpenter in the summer of 2013.
