= Hellen Chepngeno =

Kenyan long-distance runner

Medal record

Women's athletics

Representing Kenya

African Championships
Bronze medal – third place	1993 Durban	3000 m

Hellen Chepngeno (born August 2, 1967 in Kitopen, Bomet District) is a retired athlete from Kenya best known for winning gold at the 1994 World Cross Country Championships

She started her career while at Kitopen Primary School. She finished 2nd at the Kenyan cross-country championships in 1991 behind Tegla Loroupe. Chepngeno was selected to compete at the 1991 IAAF World Cross Country Championships in Antwerp, Belgium, but finished only 46th.

In 1992 she won the Kenyan trials for the 1992 IAAF World Cross Country Championships. She finished 15th at the World Cross Country Championships held in Boston, United States and was part of the Kenyan gold-medal winning team.

She did not make the Kenyan team for the 1993 IAAF World Cross Country Championships, but she won a bronze medal at the 1993 African Championships.

The 1994 World Cross Country Championships were held in Budapest, Hungary where she became the first Kenyan woman to win an individual World Cross Country Championships gold medal.

Later she suffered from injuries and was not able to repeat her earlier success. She was still competing in 1999.

During her running career, she was a corporal in the Kenya Prisons, which is famous for recruiting promising Kenyan athletes. Before starting running, she did high jump and javelin throw.

She keeps a 5-acre (20,000 m^{2}) plot in Kitopen bought with her prize money. She is not married but has two sons, one of whom was four years old in 1994.

She remained the only Kenyan national to win the long race at the World Cross Country Championships, until 2009 when Florence Kiplagat won the race.

== International competitions ==
Year	Competition	Venue	Position	Event	Notes
1992	World Cross Country Championships	Boston, United States	15th	Long race	
1992	World Cross Country Championships	Boston, United States	1st	Team	
1993	African Championships	Durban, South Africa	3rd	3000 m	
1994	World Cross Country Championships	Budapest, Hungary	1st	Long race	
1994	World Cross Country Championships	Budapest, Hungary	3rd	Team	
