= Getenesh Urge =

Ethiopian middle-distance runner

Medal record

Women's athletics

Representing Ethiopia

African Championships
Bronze medal – third place	1988 Annaba	1500 m
Bronze medal – third place	1992 Belle Vue Harel	3000 m
Bronze medal – third place	1993 Durban	1500 m

Getenesh Urge (Amharic: ጌጤነሽ ኡርጌ; born 30 August 1970) is an Ethiopian retired middle distance runner who competed in the 1980s through to 2000. She competed in the women's 1500 metres at the 1992 Summer Olympics.

She won three bronze medals at three different African Championships in Athletics. In Annaba at the 1988 Championships she won a bronze in the 1500 metres, she repeated this performance five years later in Durban at the 1993 Championships. This after the 1992 Championships in Mauritius where she won a bronze in the 3000 metres. She also won a bronze medal in Cairo at the 1991 All-Africa Games, again in the 1500 metres. She finished thirteenth in 5000 metres at the 1999 World Championships.

She has also been a part of six medal winning teams in the IAAF World Cross Country Championships finishing 31st in 1990 in winning a team silver, 28th in 1992 in winning a team bronze, 14th in 1994 in winning a team silver, 29th in 1996 in winning a team silver, 21st in 1998 in winning a team silver and 17th in 2000 in winning a team silver, all bar 2000 in the long course event.

== Personal bests ==
- 1500 metres – 4:10.75 min (2000)
- 3000 metres – 8:43.74 min (2000)
- 5000 metres – 15:22.44 min (2000)
- 10,000 metres – 32:44.82 min (2000)
- Half marathon – 1:12:04 min (2000)
