= Genet Gebregiorgis =

Ethiopian middle-distance runner

Medal record

Women's athletics

Representing Ethiopia

African Championships
Silver medal – second place	1998 Dakar	3000 m

Genet Gebregioris (born 1975 in Addis Ababa) is an Ethiopian middle-distance runner who competed in the late 1990s and early 2000s.

She won a bronze medal in the 1500 metres at the 1995 All-Africa Games held in Harare. Three years later in Dakar at the 1998 African Championships she won a silver medal in the 3000 metres.

She has also been a part of five silver medal-winning teams in the short course event at the IAAF World Cross Country Championships, finishing 11th in 1998, 16th in 1999, 17th in 2000, 16th in 2001 and 16th in 2002

== Personal bests ==
- 1500 metres – 4:08.05 min (1999)
- 3000 metres – 8:42.39 min (2001)
- 5000 metres – 16:04.40 min (1997)
