= Franklin Park (Boston) =

Park in Boston, Massachusetts

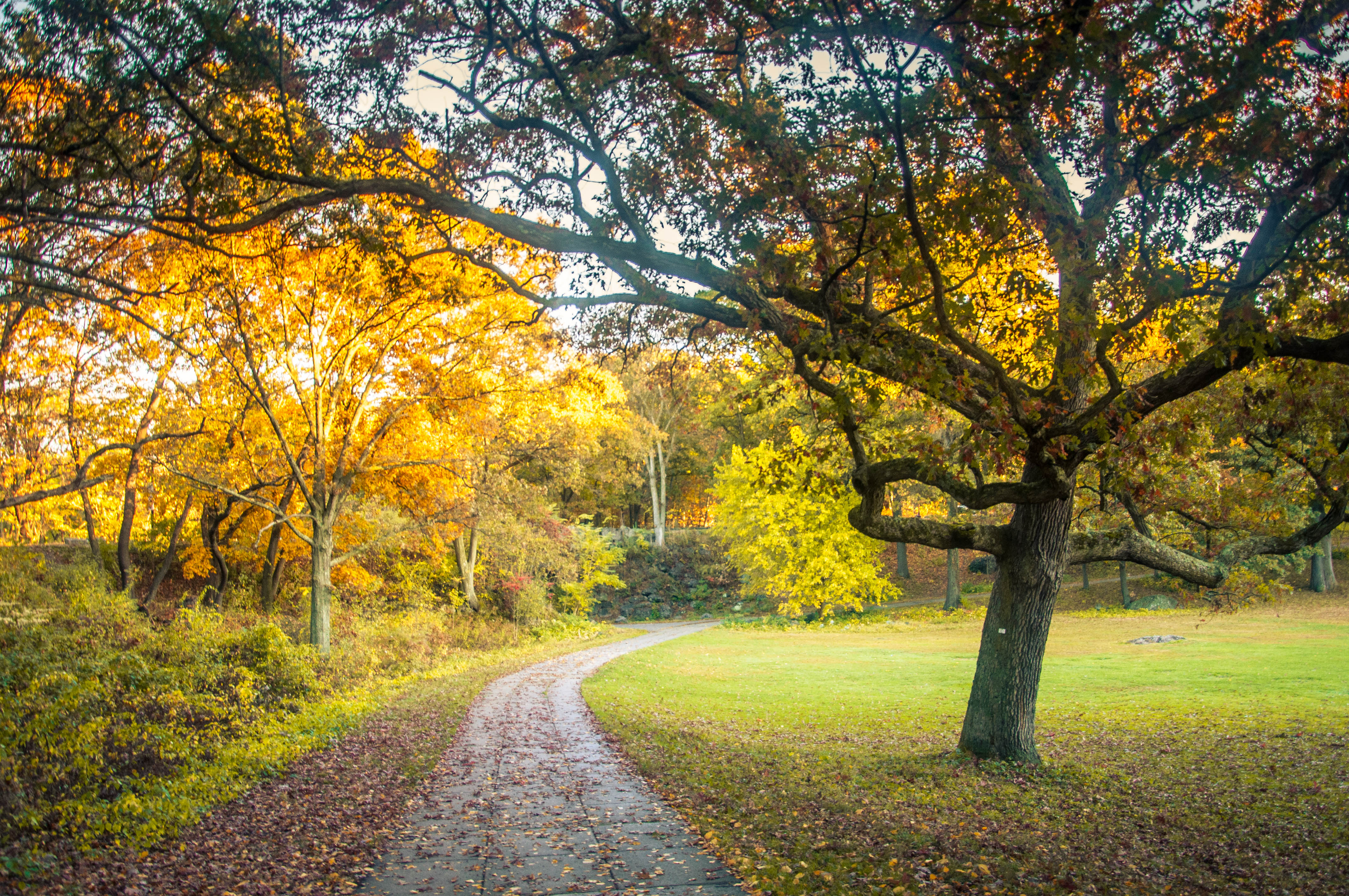
- A path in Franklin Park in October 2013
- Interactive map of Franklin Park
- Location: Boston, Massachusetts, United States
- Coordinates: 42°18′5″N 71°5′40″W
- Area: 527 acres (2.13 km^{2})
- Established: 19th century
- Operator: The City of Boston, Parks Department

Boston Landmark
- Designated: August 26, 1980

Franklin Park, a partially wooded 527-acre (2.13 km^{2}) parkland bordered by the Jamaica Plain, Roxbury, and Dorchester neighborhoods of Boston, Massachusetts, is maintained by the City of Boston Parks and Recreation Department. It is Boston's biggest park and the site of the Franklin Park Zoo. It was designated a Boston Landmark by the Boston Landmarks Commission in August 1980.

== General description ==
Considered a country park when it was formed in the 19th century, Franklin Park is the largest and last component of the Emerald Necklace created by Frederick Law Olmsted. Although often neglected in the past, it is considered the "crown jewel" of Olmsted's work in Greater Boston. It is bordered primarily by Forest Hills St., Walnut Ave., Seaver St., Blue Hill Ave., Walk Hill St., and the American Legion Highway.

Franklin Park, previously known as West Roxbury Park, was renamed in honor of Boston-born patriot Benjamin Franklin, who documented in his will that he wished for a portion of his estate to be given to a worthy cause. The park brings together rural scenery, a woodland preserve, and areas for active recreation and sports. Franklin Park also has six miles (9.7 km) of roads and fifteen miles (24 km) of pedestrian and bridle paths to explore.

Much of Franklin Park is scenic and devoted to the general use and enjoyment of the public. Scarboro Pond and Ellicott Arch are popular sites within the park, as are the large forested areas. The park also has picnic areas, stone bridges, outcroppings of Roxbury Puddingstone, and old stone ruins, specifically the Long Crouch Woods of Roxbury—also known as "the Bear Dens".

On March 4, 1980, the Boston Landmarks Commission recommended that Franklin Park be designated a landmark. The park received that designation on August 26, 1980, joining two other sections of the Emerald Necklace (Boston Common and Boston Public Garden). It was included as part of the Olmsted Park System when that landscape complex was placed on the National Register of Historic Places on December 8, 1971.

From the proceeds of the sale of the Winthrop Square Garage for redevelopment as Winthrop Center, the administration of Mayor Marty Walsh allocated $28 million for a renovation of Franklin Park, including $5 million for a maintenance endowment. An action plan for the renovation was posted for public comment in December 2022.

== Zoo ==
Franklin Park Zoo is located within the park grounds. Founded in 1912, the 72-acre (290,000 m^{2}) zoo has such exotic animals as lions, pygmy hippos, Masai giraffes, budgerigars, and western lowland gorillas. One of its most popular exhibit attractions, the Tropical Forest (formerly called the African Tropical Forest), opened in September 1989. The zoo is the second largest zoo in New England, after the Southwick's Zoo in Mendon.

== Long Crouch Woods ==
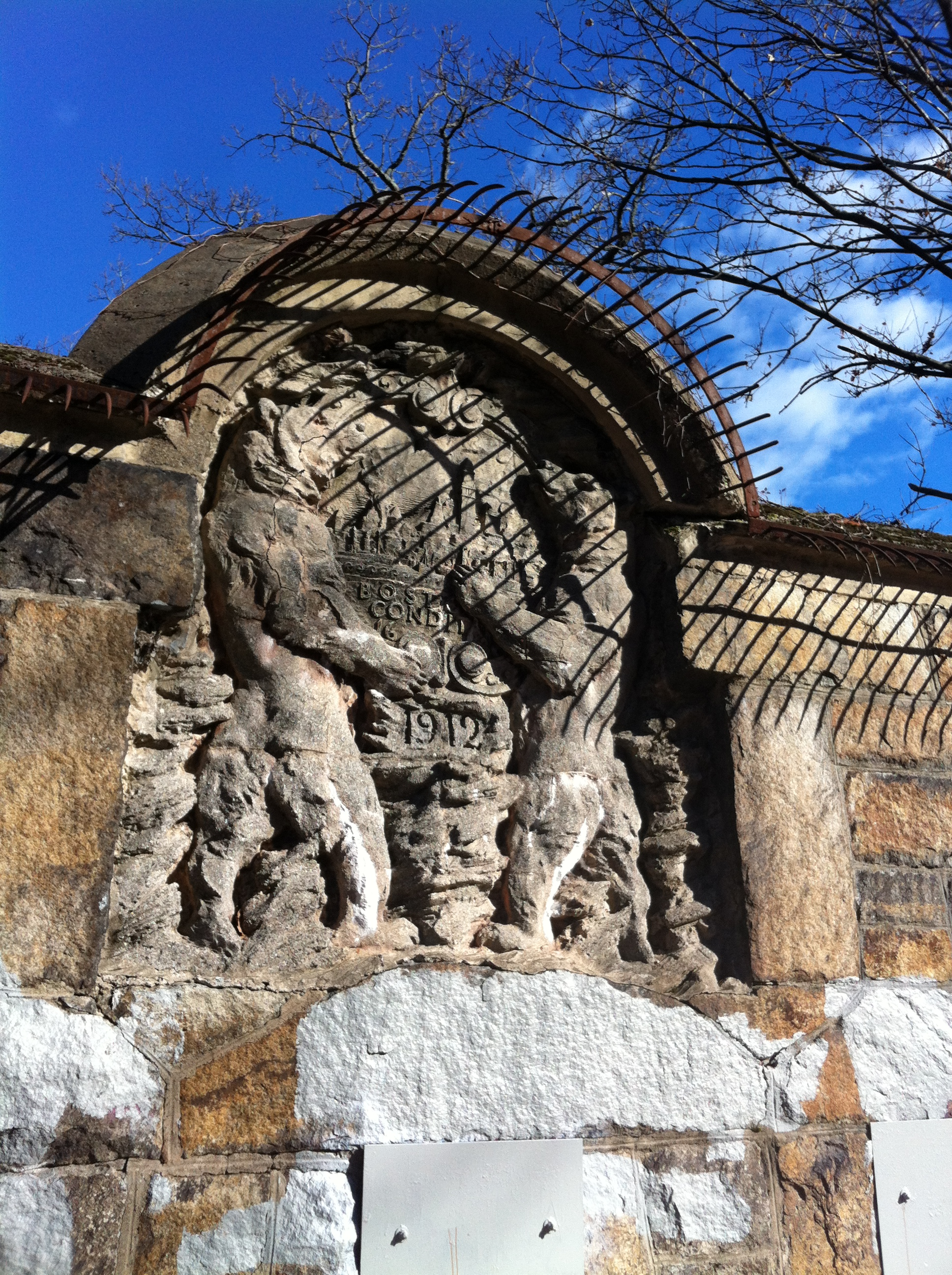
An existing 1912 sculptural stone crest of bears and city of Boston located in the Long Crouch Woods in Franklin Park.

The Long Crouch Woods, the location of the historic "Bear Dens", is also located within the park. Once the focus of the zoo, the Bear Dens were designed and built in 1912, and were planned to have a small collection of domestic animals. The original grounds featured a grand staircase leading to a large courtyard, framed by several large iron bear cages. One of these cages featured a detailed stone sculpture of bears and the crest of the City of Boston. Plans of expanding the Long Crouch Woods section of the zoo never came to fruition. As the grounds deteriorated, and as the Parks Department neglected many of the landscape's most basic management needs, the Bear Dens became too expensive to maintain. The exhibit area was officially closed in 1954. It was later lopped off of the zoo property permanently in 1958, when the Metropolitan District Commission took over management of the zoo.

Efforts have been made since 1980 to make Long Crouch Woods into a nature preserve with a snack bar and theatre facility; however, plans have continued to stall. After neighbor complaints it was not well maintained or cleaned by the city, the Franklin Park Coalition cleared the trash out of the area in 2002, and in 2007 was awarded a grant of $36,000 for materials and professional landscaping work to restore paths in the Long Crouch Woods area of Franklin Park. The project was completed with labor from summer youth crews comprising at-risk teens from the surrounding area.

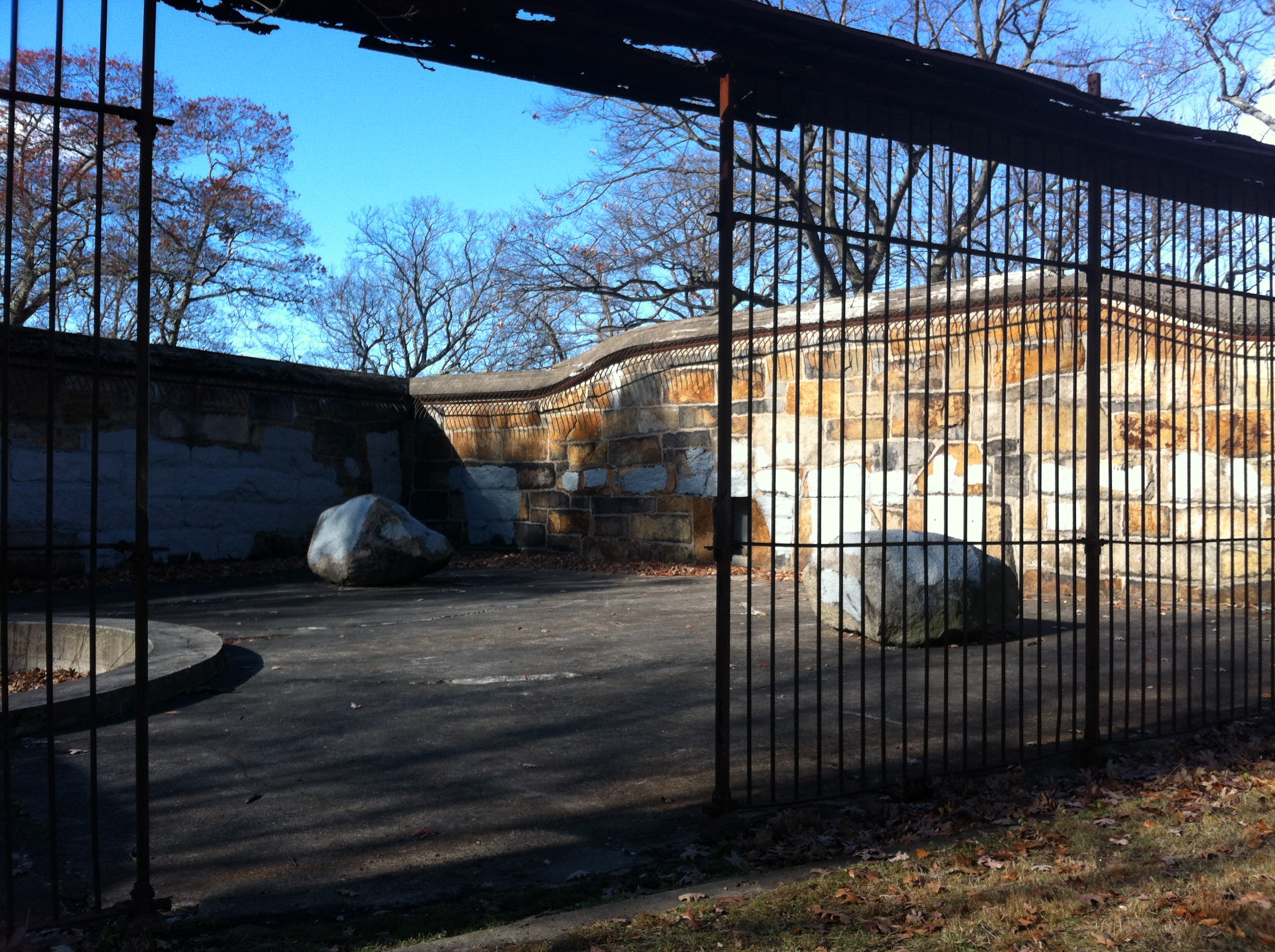
The ruins of the Bear Dens from the original Franklin Park Zoo from 1912 located in the Long Crouch Woods in Franklin Park, which are now unsuitable for housing bears.

== Athletic areas ==
Franklin Park contains the eighteen-hole William J. Devine Memorial Golf Course (the second oldest public course in the nation) as well as tennis courts, baseball fields, and several basketball courts. It also contains White Stadium, which is planned to be renovated into a 11,000-seat soccer venue for Boston Legacy FC of the National Women's Soccer League. There are large open areas used for lacrosse and soccer. One area of the park is used for cricket on Sunday afternoons. The park is a famed cross country course, hosting a number of high school and collegiate meets throughout the year. Franklin Park is home to the Massachusetts All-States Meet as well as the NCAA Northeast Regional Championship every other year (alternating with Van Cortlandt Park in New York City). The park includes courses for 3000 meters, 5000 meters, 6000 meters, 8000 meters and 10000 meters. Franklin Park also won the honor of hosting the IAAF World Cross Country Championships in 1992, as a special 12.5 kilometer course was used for competition. Each course includes variants of 3 major loops, the stadium loop, the Bear Cage hill loop, and the wilderness loop. The stadium loop simply goes around the back of White Stadium, while the Bear Cage loop climbs the fairly significant Bear Cage Hill. The wilderness loop crosses into the wooded area of the park and follows a twisting path through the trees. There are many concerns regarding continued use of the park as a racing facility, including erosion and disturbances of residents who wish to use the park for walks or peaceful bike rides. As races are hosted almost every Saturday (and a good number of Sundays) this issue will continue to be controversial.

=== Role in ice hockey history ===
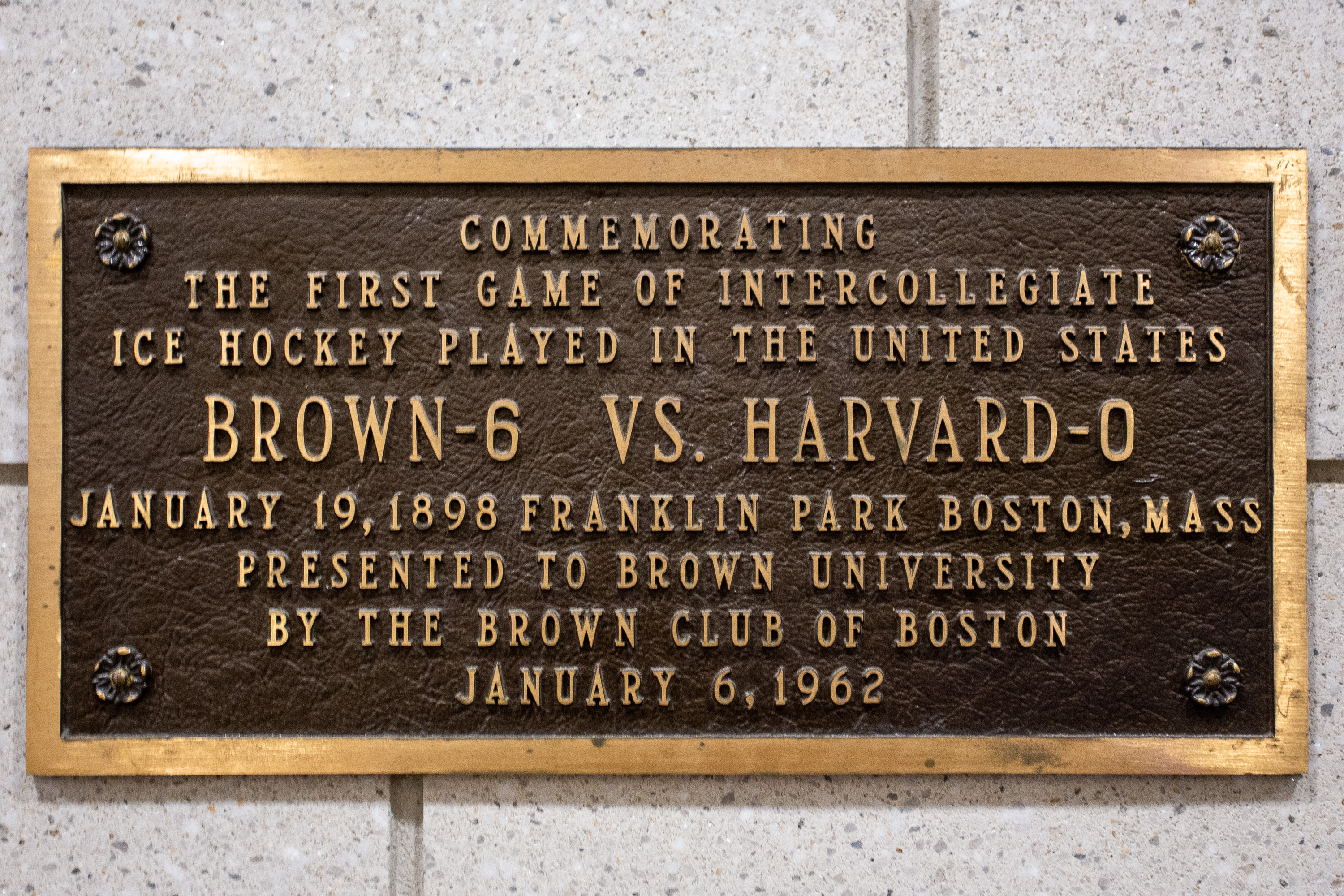
Plaque in Brown's Meehan Auditorium commemorates Franklin Park's role in ice hockey history

Franklin Park is often cited as the location of the "first game of intercollegiate ice hockey played in the United States" on January 19, 1898. Students from Brown University took the train to Boston, where they commandeered a patch of a frozen pond in Franklin Park, asked pleasure skaters to move aside, and played students from Harvard University. The details and outcome of the game were recorded in the following day's Boston Herald: Brown 6, Harvard 0.

== Playhouse ==
Franklin Park has an open-air public performance founded by Elma Lewis, a space known as the "Playhouse in the Park". This area has featured such renowned musicians as Duke Ellington, the Billy Taylor Trio and the Boston Pops.

== Schoolmaster Hill ==
From 1823 to 1824, before the park was created, Ralph Waldo Emerson lived in a small cabin atop what is now named "Schoolmaster Hill", running a "School for Young Ladies" with his mother and brother. Emerson drew upon the landscape for inspiration for nature poetry and essays. Besides a plaque devoted to Emerson's memory, Schoolmaster Hill offers views of the Blue Hills.
