= 1991 IAAF World Cross Country Championships – Senior men's race =

Senior men's race at the 1991 IAAF World Cross Country Championships
- Organisers: IAAF
- Edition: 19th
- Date: March 24
- Host city: Antwerp, Antwerp Province, Belgium
- Venue: Linkeroever Racecourse
- Events: 1
- Distances: 11.764 km – Senior men
- Participation: 237 athletes from 44 nations

The Senior men's race at the 1991 IAAF World Cross Country Championships was held in Antwerp, Belgium, at the Linkeroever Racecourse on March 24, 1991. A report on the event was given in The New York Times.

Complete results, medallists, and the results of British athletes were published.

== Race results ==
=== Senior men's race (11.764 km) ===
==== Individual ====
Rank	Athlete	Country	Time
1st place, gold medalist(s)	Khalid Skah	Morocco	33:53
2nd place, silver medalist(s)	Moses Tanui	Kenya	33:54
3rd place, bronze medalist(s)	Simon Karori	Kenya	33:54
4	Richard Chelimo	Kenya	33:57
5	Ondoro Osoro^{†}	Kenya	33:57
6	Stephenson Nyamau	Kenya	34:01
7	Chala Kelele	Ethiopia	34:06
8	Ezequiel Bitok^{†}	Kenya	34:19
9	Addis Abebe	Ethiopia	34:24
10	Hammou Boutayeb	Morocco	34:28
11	Boniface Merande	Kenya	34:31
12	William Mutwol	Kenya	34:32
13	Melese Feissa	Ethiopia	34:34
14	Alejandro Gómez	Spain	34:36
15	Steve Moneghetti	Australia	34:37
16	Joaquim Pinheiro	Portugal	34:40
17	Antonio Silio	Argentina	34:42
18	Mathias Ntawulikura	Rwanda	34:43
19	Eamonn Martin	United Kingdom	34:45
20	Martín Fiz	Spain	34:47
21	Vincent Rousseau	Belgium	34:49
22	Tekeye Gebrselassie	Ethiopia	34:51
23	Bedile Kibret	Ethiopia	34:52
24	William Koech	Kenya	34:55
25	José Carlos Adán	Spain	34:56
26	Giuseppe Miccoli	Italy	34:57
27	Oleg Strizhakov	Soviet Union	35:00
28	Dan Nelson	United States	35:01
29	Tonnie Dirks	Netherlands	35:02
30	Habte Negash	Ethiopia	35:04
31	José Manuel García	Spain	35:04
32	Mikhail Dasko	Soviet Union	35:04
33	Domingos Castro	Portugal	35:05
34	Andrew Masai	Kenya	35:06
35	Mohamed El Massoudi	Morocco	35:07
36	Dionísio Castro	Portugal	35:08
37	Antonio Serrano	Spain	35:10
38	Christian Leuprecht	Italy	35:10
39	Tendai Chimusasa	Zimbabwe	35:13
40	Artur Castro	Brazil	35:13
41	Andy Bristow	United Kingdom	35:13
42	Ezequiel Canario	Portugal	35:14
43	Mustapha Essaïd	France	35:14
44	Salvatore Bettiol	Italy	35:14
45	Henk Gommer	Netherlands	35:15
46	Antonio Martins	France	35:15
47	Peter Brett	Australia	35:16
48	Carey Nelson	Canada	35:16
49	John Nuttall	United Kingdom	35:17
50	Henrique Crisostomo	Portugal	35:17
51	Ibrahim Kinuthia^{†}	Kenya	35:18
52	Richard Nerurkar	United Kingdom	35:18
53	Steve Tunstall	United Kingdom	35:19
54	Ruddy Walem	Belgium	35:19
55	Arnold Mächler	Switzerland	35:19
56	Juvenal Ribeiro	Portugal	35:20
57	Jacinto Navarrete	Colombia	35:20
58	Darren Klassen	Canada	35:23
59	Hamid Essebani	Morocco	35:23
60	Carlo Terzer	Italy	35:24
61	Are Nakkim	Norway	35:25
62	Paul Williams	Canada	35:25
63	Phillip Clode	New Zealand	35:26
64	Manuel Matias	Portugal	35:27
65	Benedito Gomes	Brazil	35:28
66	Robert de Brouwer	Netherlands	35:28
67	Paul Roden	United Kingdom	35:29
68	Pat Porter	United States	35:29
69	Yosuke Osawa	Japan	35:30
70	Marcelo Cascabelo	Argentina	35:31
71	Abel Antón	Spain	35:32
72	Boay Akoney	Tanzania	35:33
73	Aleksandr Burtsev	Soviet Union	35:35
74	Mohamed Choumassi	Morocco	35:36
75	John Halvorsen	Norway	35:36
76	Francesco Bennici	Italy	35:38
77	Luíz dos Santos	Brazil	35:39
78	Dan Reese	United States	35:39
79	Nikolay Chameyev	Soviet Union	35:41
80	Nigousse Urge	Ethiopia	35:41
81	Rodney Higgins	Australia	35:42
82	Rex Wilson	New Zealand	35:42
83	Bob Kempainen	United States	35:43
84	Jos Maes	Belgium	35:43
85	Mark Coogan	United States	35:44
86	Mohammed Mourhit	Morocco	35:45
87	Shozo Shimoju	Japan	35:45
88	Delmir dos Santos	Brazil	35:46
89	Graeme Fell	Canada	35:46
90	Gennadiy Temnikov	Soviet Union	35:47
91	Feyissa Abebe	Ethiopia	35:48
92	Franco Boffi	Italy	35:49
93	Pat Carroll	Australia	35:50
94	Julio Hernandez	Colombia	35:51
95	Rod de Highden	Australia	35:51
96	Róbert Stefko	Czechoslovakia	35:52
97	Pierre Levisse	France	35:52
98	Antonio Prieto	Spain	35:52
99	Alberto Maravilha	Portugal	35:53
100	Henrik Jørgensen	Denmark	35:53
101	Felix Mbuye	Zambia	35:54
102	Pascal Depret	France	35:55
103	Martin McLoughlin	United Kingdom	35:56
104	Eddy de Pauw	Belgium	35:56
105	Angelo Carosi	Italy	35:57
106	Kimball Reynierse	Aruba	35:58
107	Rafael Zepeda	Mexico	35:58
108	Mikhail Khramov	Soviet Union	36:00
109	Abdallah Hafid	Morocco	36:00
110	Diamantino dos Santos	Brazil	36:01
111	Hansjörg Brücker	Switzerland	36:01
112	Clair Wathier	Brazil	36:02
113	Carlos Grisales	Colombia	36:03
114	Herman Hofstee	Netherlands	36:04
115	William Taylor	United States	36:05
116	Brendan Matthias	Canada	36:05
117	Luis Ibarra	Brazil	36:06
118	Paul Smith	New Zealand	36:06
119	Constantino Esparcia	Spain	36:07
120	Vincenzo Modica	Italy	36:08
121	Aaron Ramirez	United States	36:09
122	Dave Lewis	United Kingdom	36:10
123	Gerry Curtis	Ireland	36:14
124	Juma Mnyampanda	Tanzania	36:14
125	Malcolm Norwood	Australia	36:15
126	Rafael Muñoz	Mexico	36:16
127	Magnus Bergman	Sweden	36:17
128	Akira Nakamura	Japan	36:18
129	Thomas Wood	United States	36:18
130	Håvard Tveite	Norway	36:18
131	Othmar Schoop	Switzerland	36:19
132	Luis Soares	France	36:19
133	Oscar Amaya	Argentina	36:20
134	Petr Pipa	Czechoslovakia	36:20
135	Victor Ndlovu	Zimbabwe	36:21
136	Koji Hirata	Japan	36:22
137	Pyotr Sarafynyuk	Soviet Union	36:23
138	Marc Vanderstraeten	Belgium	36:23
139	Jiří Švec	Czechoslovakia	36:23
140	Noel Richardson	Ireland	36:24
141	Steven Brooks	United Kingdom	36:24
142	Jacob Muunga	Zambia	36:25
143	Shaun Creighton	Australia	36:26
144	Luc Krotwaar	Netherlands	36:27
145	Robert O'Donnell	Australia	36:28
146	Bjørn Nordheggen	Norway	36:28
147	Godfrey Siamusiye	Zambia	36:29
148	Stig Nørregaard	Denmark	36:30
149	Tetiani Moyo	Zimbabwe	36:30
150	Oleg Syroyezhko	Soviet Union	36:34
151	Philippe Rémond	France	36:35
152	Terje Näss	Norway	36:36
153	Shivkumar Shreshta	India	36:37
154	Gerardo Reyes	Mexico	36:37
155	Stanislav Tabor	Czechoslovakia	36:38
156	Bernd Bürger	Germany	36:39
157	Raf Wijns	Belgium	36:40
158	Jozef Vybostok	Czechoslovakia	36:41
159	Diomede Cishahayo	Burundi	36:42
160	Marcel Versteeg	Netherlands	36:44
161	Martin Ryan	Ireland	36:46
162	Angel Cardenas	Chile	36:47
163	Juan Carlos Paul	Spain	36:47
164	Amar Benaceur	France	36:49
165	João Ataide	Brazil	36:49
166	Wilson Theleso	Botswana	36:50
167	Muchapiwa Mazano	Zimbabwe	36:50
168	Viktor Gural	Soviet Union	36:51
169	Maximino Ayala	Mexico	36:51
170	Vit Chrbolka	Czechoslovakia	36:52
171	Cusimiro Reyes	Mexico	36:53
172	Sean Wade	New Zealand	36:57
173	Ivan Uvizl	Czechoslovakia	36:58
174	Brighton Chipere	Zimbabwe	36:59
175	Kasimir Kunz	Switzerland	37:02
176	Mickael Dufermont	France	37:03
177	Marius Hasler	Switzerland	37:04
178	Mark Furlan	New Zealand	37:05
179	Roy Dooney	Ireland	37:07
180	Winford Munthali	Zambia	37:09
181	Abhay Singh	India	37:11
182	Jean Mahatana	Madagascar	37:12
183	Lubos Cesnek	Czechoslovakia	37:14
184	Ivo Claes	Belgium	37:15
185	Dinesh Kumar	India	37:17
186	Raymond van Paemel	Belgium	37:22
187	Udai Pratap Singh	India	37:23
188	René Godlieb	Netherlands	37:24
189	Leonardo Malgor	Argentina	37:26
190	Adriano Pezzoli	Italy	37:27
191	Jose Duarte	Mexico	37:28
192	Tom Maher	Ireland	37:29
193	João N'tyamba	Angola	37:30
194	Rod DeHaven	United States	37:34
195	Andrea Erni	Switzerland	37:35
196	Jafar Babakhani	Iran	37:39
197	Robbie Johnston	New Zealand	37:40
198	Dominique Chauvelier	France	37:41
199	Noel Cullen	Ireland	37:42
200	Knut Bakken	Norway	37:48
201	Martin Simeon	Namibia	37:50
202	Richard Charette	Canada	37:52
203	Redson Munsanje	Zambia	37:53
204	Richard Potts	New Zealand	37:54
205	Marc van Rooy	Netherlands	37:54
206	Benjamin Keleketu	Botswana	37:55
207	Gino van Geyte	Belgium	37:57
208	Toribio Gutierres	Argentina	38:05
209	Carlos Naput	Argentina	38:08
210	Jamie Harrison	Australia	38:15
211	Alain Bordeleau	Canada	38:19
212	Mohinder Singh	India	38:20
213	Mike Felicite	Mauritius	38:24
214	Michel Jean-Louis	Mauritius	38:40
215	Hasan Sabzevari	Iran	38:46
216	Brian Gillatt	New Zealand	38:55
217	Ali Movahedpoor	Iran	39:01
218	Wang Chen-Hui	Chinese Taipei	39:02
219	Hsu Gi-Sheng	Chinese Taipei	39:11
220	Shiv Kumar Yadav	India	39:18
221	Hsu Yi-Chung	Chinese Taipei	39:21
222	Patrick Moonsamy	Mauritius	39:25
223	Jean Newk-See	Mauritius	39:30
224	Clement Pirogue	Mauritius	39:33
225	Robert Kusi	Botswana	39:36
226	Paddy McCluskey	Canada	39:53
227	Pascal Face	Mauritius	39:55
228	Ajay Chuttoo	Mauritius	40:03
229	Calvin Dallas	U.S. Virgin Islands	40:18
230	Dominique Huryl	Mauritius	40:19
—	John Campbell	New Zealand	DNF
—	Paul McCloy	Canada	DNF
—	John Ngugi	Kenya	DNF
—	John Downes	Ireland	DNF
—	Bernt Eltervaag	Norway	DNF
—	Tom Fineda	Guam	DNF
—	Joaquim Silva	Portugal	DNF

^{†}: Athlete marked in the results list as nonscorer.

==== Teams ====
Rank	Team	Points
1st place, gold medalist(s)	Kenya: Moses Tanui / 2; Simon Karori / 3; Richard Chelimo / 4; Stephenson Nyamau / 6; Boniface Merande / 11; William Mutwol / 12; (William Koech) / (24); (Andrew Masai) / (34); (John Ngugi) / (DNF)	38
2nd place, silver medalist(s)	Ethiopia: Chala Kelele / 7; Addis Abebe / 9; Melese Feissa / 13; Tekeye Gebrselassie / 22; Bedile Kibret / 23; Habte Negash / 30; (Nigousse Urge) / (80); (Feyissa Abebe) / (91)	104
3rd place, bronze medalist(s)	Spain: Alejandro Gómez / 14; Martín Fiz / 20; José Carlos Adán / 25; José Manuel García / 31; Antonio Serrano / 37; Abel Antón / 71; (Antonio Prieto) / (98); (Constantino Esparcia) / (119); (Juan Carlos Paul) / (163)	198
4	Portugal: Joaquim Pinheiro / 16; Domingos Castro / 33; Dionísio Castro / 36; Ezequiel Canario / 42; Henrique Crisostomo / 50; Juvenal Ribeiro / 56; (Manuel Matias) / (64); (Alberto Maravilha) / (99); (Joaquim Silva) / (DNF)	233
5	Morocco: Khalid Skah / 1; Hammou Boutayeb / 10; Mohamed El Massoudi / 35; Hamid Essebani / 59; Mohamed Choumassi / 74; Mohammed Mourhit / 86; (Abdallah Hafid) / (109)	265
6	United Kingdom: Eamonn Martin / 19; Andy Bristow / 41; John Nuttall / 49; Richard Nerurkar / 52; Steve Tunstall / 53; Paul Roden / 67; (Martin McLoughlin) / (103); (Dave Lewis) / (122); (Steven Brooks) / (141)	281
7	Italy: Giuseppe Miccoli / 26; Christian Leuprecht / 38; Salvatore Bettiol / 44; Carlo Terzer / 60; Francesco Bennici / 76; Franco Boffi / 92; (Angelo Carosi) / (105); (Vincenzo Modica) / (120); (Adriano Pezzoli) / (190)	336
8	Soviet Union: Oleg Strizhakov / 27; Mikhail Dasko / 32; Aleksandr Burtsev / 73; Nikolay Chameyev / 79; Gennadiy Temnikov / 90; Mikhail Khramov / 108; (Pyotr Sarafynyuk) / (137); (Oleg Syroyezhko) / (150); (Viktor Gural) / (168)	409
9	Australia: Steve Moneghetti / 15; Peter Brett / 47; Rodney Higgins / 81; Pat Carroll / 93; Rod de Highden / 95; Malcolm Norwood / 125; (Shaun Creighton) / (143); (Robert O'Donnell) / (145); (Jamie Harrison) / (210)	456
10	United States: Dan Nelson / 28; Pat Porter / 68; Dan Reese / 78; Bob Kempainen / 83; Mark Coogan / 85; William Taylor / 115; (Aaron Ramirez) / (121); (Thomas Wood) / (129); (Rod DeHaven) / (194)	457
11	Brazil: Artur Castro / 40; Benedito Gomes / 65; Luíz dos Santos / 77; Delmir dos Santos / 88; Diamantino dos Santos / 110; Clair Wathier / 112; (Luis Ibarra) / (117); (João Ataide) / (165)	492
12	Belgium: Vincent Rousseau / 21; Ruddy Walem / 54; Jos Maes / 84; Eddy de Pauw / 104; Marc Vanderstraeten / 138; Raf Wijns / 157; (Ivo Claes) / (184); (Raymond van Paemel) / (186); (Gino van Geyte) / (207)	558
13	Netherlands: Tonnie Dirks / 29; Henk Gommer / 45; Robert de Brouwer / 66; Herman Hofstee / 114; Luc Krotwaar / 144; Marcel Versteeg / 160; (René Godlieb) / (188); (Marc van Rooy) / (205)	558
14	France: Mustapha Essaïd / 43; Antonio Martins / 46; Pierre Levisse / 97; Pascal Depret / 102; Luis Soares / 132; Philippe Rémond / 151; (Amar Benaceur) / (164); (Mickael Dufermont) / (176); (Dominique Chauvelier) / (198)	571
15	Canada: Carey Nelson / 48; Darren Klassen / 58; Paul Williams / 62; Graeme Fell / 89; Brendan Matthias / 116; Richard Charette / 202; (Alain Bordeleau) / (211); (Paddy McCluskey) / (226); (Paul McCloy) / (DNF)	575
16	Norway: Are Nakkim / 61; John Halvorsen / 75; Håvard Tveite / 130; Bjørn Nordheggen / 146; Terje Näss / 152; Knut Bakken / 200; (Bernt Eltervaag) / (DNF)	764
17	New Zealand: Phillip Clode / 63; Rex Wilson / 82; Paul Smith / 118; Sean Wade / 172; Mark Furlan / 178; Robbie Johnston / 197; (Richard Potts) / (204); (Brian Gillatt) / (216); (John Campbell) / (DNF)	810
18	Argentina: Antonio Silio / 17; Marcelo Cascabelo / 70; Oscar Amaya / 133; Leonardo Malgor / 189; Toribio Gutierres / 208; Carlos Naput / 209	826
19	Switzerland: Arnold Mächler / 55; Hansjörg Brücker / 111; Othmar Schoop / 131; Kasimir Kunz / 175; Marius Hasler / 177; Andrea Erni / 195	844
20	Czechoslovakia: Róbert Stefko / 96; Petr Pipa / 134; Jiří Švec / 139; Stanislav Tabor / 155; Jozef Vybostok / 158; Vit Chrbolka / 170; (Ivan Uvizl) / (173); (Lubos Cesnek) / (183)	852
21	Mexico: Rafael Zepeda / 107; Rafael Muñoz / 126; Gerardo Reyes / 154; Maximino Ayala / 169; Cusimiro Reyes / 171; Jose Duarte / 191	918
22	Ireland: Gerry Curtis / 123; Noel Richardson / 140; Martin Ryan / 161; Roy Dooney / 179; Tom Maher / 192; Noel Cullen / 199; (John Downes) / (DNF)	994
23	India: Shivkumar Shreshta / 153; Abhay Singh / 181; Dinesh Kumar / 185; Udai Pratap Singh / 187; Mohinder Singh / 212; Shiv Kumar Yadav / 220	1138
24	Mauritius: Mike Felicite / 213; Michel Jean-Louis / 214; Patrick Moonsamy / 222; Jean Newk-See / 223; Clement Pirogue / 224; Pascal Face / 227; (Ajay Chuttoo) / (228); (Dominique Huryl) / (230)	1323

- Note: Athletes in parentheses did not score for the team result

== Participation ==
An unofficial count yields the participation of 237 athletes from 44 countries in the Senior men's race. This is in agreement with the official numbers as published.

- Angola (1)
- Argentina (6)
- Aruba (1)
- Australia (9)
- Belgium (9)
- Botswana (3)
- Brazil (8)
- Burundi (1)
- Canada (9)
- Chile (1)
- Chinese Taipei (3)
- Colombia (3)
- Czechoslovakia (8)
- Denmark (2)
- Ethiopia (8)
- France (9)
- Germany (1)
- Guam (1)
- India (6)
- Iran (3)
- Ireland (7)
- Italy (9)
- Japan (4)
- Kenya (12)
- Madagascar (1)
- Mauritius (8)
- Mexico (6)
- Morocco (7)
- Namibia (1)
- Netherlands (8)
- New Zealand (9)
- Norway (7)
- Portugal (9)
- Rwanda (1)
- Soviet Union (9)
- Spain (9)
- Sweden (1)
- Switzerland (6)
- Tanzania (2)
- United Kingdom (9)
- United States (9)
- U.S. Virgin Islands (1)
- Zambia (5)
- Zimbabwe (5)

== See also ==
- 1991 IAAF World Cross Country Championships – Junior men's race
- 1991 IAAF World Cross Country Championships – Senior women's race
- 1991 IAAF World Cross Country Championships – Junior women's race
