= 1994 IAAF World Road Relay Championships =

- Dates: 16–17 April 1994
- Host city: Litochoro, Greece
- Level: Senior
- Type: Marathon relay
- Events: 2
- Participation: 240 athletes from 23 nations

The 1994 IAAF World Road Relay Championships was the second edition of the global, international marathon relay competition, organised by the International Association of Athletics Federations (IAAF). The event took place on 16–17 April on a 5-kilometre circuit in Litochoro, Greece with the participation of 240 athletes (162 men and 78 women) from 23 nations. The women's race took place on Saturday 16 April and the men's race took place on Sunday 17 April.

Each national team consisted of six athletes, who alternately covered six stages to complete the 42.195 km marathon distance. The first, third and fifth stages were of 5 km, the second and fourth stages were of 10 km, and the final stage covered the remaining 7.195 km.

In the women's race, Askale Bereda and Derartu Tulu ran the fastest times of the first two stages to establish a 40-second lead for Ethiopia. On the third leg, Yelena Kopytova made up this deficit to give the Russians a 6-second lead. Her compatriots Olga Churbanova and Yelena Romanova won the final two stages to take gold for Russia in a time of 2:17:19 hours. Ethiopia were a comfortable second in 2:19:09 hours, while Romania took third nine seconds behind with the help of fourth stage winner Anuța Cătună.

In the men's race, Worku Bikila gained a five-second lead for Ethiopia in the first leg. A fast second leg from Joseph Kibor, saw Kenya take the lead by 12 seconds. Hicham El Guerrouj made up half a minute on the third leg to take the lead for Morocco. Salah Hissou and Brahim Boutayeb won the next two stages to cement the lead for Morocco resulting in a championship record time of 1:57:56 hours. Just under a minute behind were Ethiopia in 1:58:51, courtesy of leg six winner Haile Gebrselassie. Kenya finished a clear third in 2:00:51 hours.

== Medal summary ==
Event	Gold		Silver		Bronze	
Men's race	Morocco; Brahim Jabbour; Elarbi Khattabi; Hicham El Guerrouj; Salah Hissou; Brahim Boutayeb; Khalid Skah	1:57:56	Ethiopia; Worku Bikila; Badilu Kibret; Abraham Assefa; Fita Bayisa; Chala Kelele; Haile Gebrselassie	1:58:51	Kenya; Peter Ndirangu; Joseph Kibor; Clement Kiprotich; Paul Yego; John Kiprono; Simon Rono	2:00:51
Women's race	Russia; Tatyana Pentukova; Nadezhda Stepanova; Yelena Kopytova; Natalya Solominskaya; Yelena Romanova; Olga Churbanova	2:17:19	Ethiopia; Askale Bereda; Derartu Tulu; Leila Aman; Gadissie Edato; Birhan Dagne; Asha Gigi	2:19:09	Romania; Daniela Petrescu; Alina Gherasim; Mariana Chirila; Anuța Cătună; Florina Pană; Iulia Olteanu	2:19:18

== Stage winners ==
Stage	Distance	Men	Time	Women	Time
1	5 km	Worku Bikila (ETH)	13:30	Askale Bereda (ETH)	16:05
2	10 km	Joseph Kibor (KEN)	28:19	Derartu Tulu (ETH)	32:26
3	5 km	Hicham El Guerrouj (MAR)	13:43	Yelena Kopytova (RUS)	15:45
4	10 km	Salah Hissou (MAR)	27:57	Anuța Cătună (ROM)	33:16
5	5 km	Brahim Boutayeb (MAR)	13:53	Yelena Romanova (RUS)	15:48
6	7.195 km	Haile Gebrselassie (ETH)	19:27	Olga Churbanova (RUS)	23:14

== Results ==
=== Men's race ===
Rank	Team	Time
1	Morocco; Brahim Jabbour; Elarbi Khattabi; Hicham El Guerrouj; Salah Hissou; Brahim Boutayeb; Khalid Skah	1:57:56
2	Ethiopia; Worku Bikila; Badilu Kibret; Abraham Assefa; Fita Bayisa; Chala Kelele; Haile Gebrselassie	1:58:51
3	Kenya; Peter Ndirangu; Joseph Kibor; Clement Kiprotich; Paul Yego; John Kiprono; Simon Rono	2:00:51
4	Zimbabwe; Musa Gwanzura; Bigboy Goromonzi; Brighton Chipere; Winstone Muzuni; Kingstone Maringe; Tendai Chimusasa	2:01:42
5	United Kingdom; Keith Cullen; Dave Clarke; Paul Taylor; Martin Jones; Colin Moore; Barry Royden	2:02:12
6	Italy; Alessandro Lambruschini; Francesco Bennici; Gianni Crepaldi; Renato Gotti; Giuliano Baccani; Stefano Mei	2:02:39
7	Japan; Seiichi Miyajima; Shinji Kawashima; Teruo Oga; Junji Haraguchi; Koichi Fujita; Kozu Akutsu	2:02:52
8	Brazil; Daniel Ferreira; Adalberto García; Sergio da Silva; Tomix da Costa; Eduardo do Nascimento; Clodoaldo do Carmo	2:03:23

=== Women's race ===
Rank	Team	Time
1	Russia; Tatyana Pentukova; Nadezhda Stepanova; Yelena Kopytova; Natalya Solominskaya; Yelena Romanova; Olga Churbanova	2:17:19
2	Ethiopia; Askale Bereda; Derartu Tulu; Leila Aman; Gadissie Edato; Birhan Dagne; Asha Gigi	2:19:09
3	Romania; Daniela Petrescu; Alina Gherasim; Mariana Chirila; Anuța Cătună; Florina Pană; Iulia Olteanu	2:19:18
4	Italy; Flavia Gaviglio; Rosanna Munerotto; Patrizia Di Napoli; Ornella Ferrara; Marzia Gazzetta; Silvia Sommaggio	2:19:23
5	United States; Carmen Ayala-Troncoso; Lori Hewig; Sammie Gdowski; Inge Schuurmans; Ceci Hopp; Lucy Nusrala	2:19:40
6	Ukraine; Svetlana Miroshnik; Tamara Koba; Zoya Kaznovskaya; Irina Yagodina; Tatyana Belovol; Tatyana Pozdnyakova	2:20:15
7	China; Wang Renmei; Liu Jianying; Wang Qingfen; Wei Li; Chen Xiuying; Wang Xiujie	2:21:05
8	United Kingdom; Marian Sutton; Vikki McPherson; Tanya Blake; Joanna Thompson; Sonia McGeorge; Laura Adam	2:21:52
