= 1991 IAAF World Cross Country Championships – Junior men's race =

Junior men's race at the 1991 IAAF World Cross Country Championships
- Organisers: IAAF
- Edition: 19th
- Date: March 24
- Host city: Antwerp, Antwerp Province, Belgium
- Venue: Linkeroever Racecourse
- Events: 1
- Distances: 8.415 km – Junior men
- Participation: 143 athletes from 31 nations

The Junior men's race at the 1991 IAAF World Cross Country Championships was held in Antwerp, Belgium, at the Linkeroever Racecourse on March 24, 1991. A report on the event was given in The New York Times.

Complete results, medallists, and the results of British athletes were published.

== Race results ==
=== Junior men's race (8.415 km) ===
==== Individual ====
Rank	Athlete	Country	Time
1st place, gold medalist(s)	Andrew Sambu	Tanzania	23:59
2nd place, silver medalist(s)	Mumo Muindi	Kenya	24:04
3rd place, bronze medalist(s)	Fita Bayissa	Ethiopia	24:04
4	Joseph Kibor	Kenya	24:09
5	Fekadu Degefu	Ethiopia	24:12
6	Josephat Kiprono N'Deti	Kenya	24:17
7	Ismael Kirui	Kenya	24:19
8	Haile Gebrselassie	Ethiopia	24:23
9	Mark Kipsang Too	Kenya	24:23
10	Desta Asgedom	Ethiopia	24:29
11	Abraham Assefa	Ethiopia	24:29
12	Francis Metta	Tanzania	25:07
13	Ayele Mezegebu	Ethiopia	25:07
14	Salah Hissou	Morocco	25:14
15	Samir M'tougui	Morocco	25:15
16	Yahia Azaidj	Algeria	25:16
17	Kazumi Honkawa	Japan	25:16
18	Onesmo Ludago	Tanzania	25:25
19	Keith Cullen	United Kingdom	25:30
20	Kazuhiro Kawauchi	Japan	25:37
21	Mohamed Ramdi	Morocco	25:40
22	Michal Kucera	Czechoslovakia	25:42
23	Juma Ninga	Tanzania	25:44
24	Saad Ayeb	Algeria	25:45
25	John Murray	Ireland	25:46
26	Charif El Ouardi	Morocco	25:46
27	Yoichiro Kan	Japan	25:48
28	Dmitriy Drozdov	Soviet Union	25:49
29	Robert Conder	New Zealand	25:49
30	Abdelhak Lebouazda	Algeria	25:51
31	Joseph Kibur	Canada	25:52
32	Mohamed Belasri	Morocco	25:54
33	Jon Gascoyne	United Kingdom	25:55
34	Javier Rodríguez	Spain	25:56
35	Mark Carroll	Ireland	26:02
36	Mateo Cañellas	Spain	26:06
37	Sergey Fedotov	Soviet Union	26:08
38	Yasuyuki Watanabe	Japan	26:09
39	Hakim Djadir	Algeria	26:10
40	Michael Cox	United States	26:11
41	Takaomi Kawanami	Japan	26:15
42	William Roldán	Colombia	26:16
43	Aissa Menai	Algeria	26:18
44	Piotr Gładki	Poland	26:19
45	David Bretel	France	26:20
46	Marcel Rocha	Brazil	26:20
47	Jason Rock	Australia	26:21
48	José Manuel Pérez	Spain	26:21
49	Martin Detka	Czechoslovakia	26:22
50	Amar Dahbi	Algeria	26:22
51	Oleg Symbai	Soviet Union	26:23
52	Jonathan Wyatt	New Zealand	26:27
53	Teddy Mitchell	United States	26:27
54	Michael Gottschalk	Germany	26:29
55	Steffan White	United Kingdom	26:31
56	Mustapha Ouaziz	Morocco	26:35
57	Juan Luis Gómez	Spain	26:36
58	Colin Walker	United Kingdom	26:37
59	Thierry Breuil	France	26:37
60	Kevin Toher	United Kingdom	26:38
61	Edson Galvao	Brazil	26:39
62	Danilo Goffi	Italy	26:40
63	Jai Krishnan	India	26:41
64	Brian Clas	United States	26:42
65	Julio Figueiredo	Portugal	26:45
66	Kevin Sullivan	Canada	26:47
67	Cyrille Ballester	France	26:47
68	Apolinar Caudillo	Mexico	26:48
69	Stan Rijken	Netherlands	26:48
70	Tom van Hooste	Belgium	26:48
71	Leonardo Cavalieri Foschini	Italy	26:49
72	Marco Orsi	Italy	26:49
73	Ashok Kumar	India	26:50
74	Robert Jan de Graaf	Netherlands	26:53
75	Brett Cartwright	Australia	26:54
76	David Robertson	United Kingdom	26:56
77	K.M. Chinnappa	India	26:58
78	Janik Lambert	Canada	27:00
79	Hector Fernandez	Mexico	27:00
80	Tomoyuki Yamauchi	Japan	27:01
81	Carlos Roldan	Colombia	27:01
82	André Green	Germany	27:02
83	Milson de Souza	Brazil	27:02
84	Stuart Burnham	United States	27:03
85	Christian Fischer	Germany	27:03
86	Jeff Schiebler	Canada	27:04
87	Bernard Joliat	Switzerland	27:04
88	Conor Holt	Ireland	27:05
89	Kyle Armentrout	United States	27:07
90	Donal Gallagher	Ireland	27:08
91	Emerson Vettori	Brazil	27:09
92	Alessandro Moltoni	Italy	27:11
93	Johan Swärdh	Sweden	27:11
94	Jocelyn Coste	France	27:13
95	Petr Prokop	Czechoslovakia	27:17
96	Oscar Gilotti	Italy	27:21
97	Javier Caballero	Spain	27:22
98	Trent Wood	Australia	27:24
99	Michael Volker	Germany	27:26
100	Samuel Schmutz	Switzerland	27:26
101	Kailash Mane	India	27:27
102	Koen van Rie	Belgium	27:33
103	Oliver Wirz	Switzerland	27:36
104	Gert Teniers	Belgium	27:36
105	Chris Unthank	Australia	27:37
106	Francisco Munuera	Spain	27:37
107	Dale Warrander	New Zealand	27:39
108	Kim Runeson	Sweden	27:41
109	Rik Courtens	Belgium	27:44
110	Jesper Skantz	Sweden	27:49
111	Massimiliano Centorame	Italy	27:52
112	Othmar Bamert	Switzerland	27:54
113	Ulrich Steidl	Germany	27:55
114	Marcel Matanin	Czechoslovakia	27:56
115	Geert Eeckhoout	Belgium	28:00
116	Anton Huyben	Netherlands	28:01
117	Robert Ellis	Australia	28:14
118	Arvid Levinsson	Sweden	28:21
119	Marko Koers	Netherlands	28:22
120	Brant Armentrout	United States	28:22
121	Denis Renaurt	Belgium	28:23
122	Greg van Hest	Netherlands	28:40
123	Richard Muscat	Gibraltar	28:48
124	Paul Ignacio	Gibraltar	28:56
125	Percy Labonne	Mauritius	29:00
126	Freeman Rogers	Canada	29:16
127	David Boddington	Australia	29:24
128	Tyrone Cano	Gibraltar	29:30
129	Heinz Lehmann	Switzerland	29:33
130	Judex Jean-Louis	Mauritius	29:35
131	Chris Halfyard	Canada	29:45
132	Gareth Cano	Gibraltar	29:53
133	Steven Roberts	Gibraltar	29:54
134	Alan O'Gorman	Ireland	30:00
135	Luciano Labonne	Mauritius	31:09
136	Darren McComb	Gibraltar	31:33
137	Jay Antonio	Guam	31:53
138	Paul Gutierrez	Guam	32:05
139	Art Julaton	Guam	33:28
—	Fabrice Chomaud	France	DNF
—	Bedaso Turbe	Ethiopia	DNF
—	Thomas Greger	Germany	DNF
—	Frederic Prini	France	DNF

==== Teams ====
Rank	Team	Points
1st place, gold medalist(s)	Kenya: Mumo Muindi / 2; Joseph Kibor / 4; Josephat Kiprono N'Deti / 6; Ismael Kirui / 7; (Mark Kipsang Too) / (9)	19
2nd place, silver medalist(s)	Ethiopia: Fita Bayissa / 3; Fekadu Degefu / 5; Haile Gebrselassie / 8; Desta Asgedom / 10; (Abraham Assefa) / (11); (Ayele Mezegebu) / (13); (Bedaso Turbe) / (DNF)	26
3rd place, bronze medalist(s)	Tanzania: Andrew Sambu / 1; Francis Metta / 12; Onesmo Ludago / 18; Juma Ninga / 23	54
4	Morocco: Salah Hissou / 14; Samir M'tougui / 15; Mohamed Ramdi / 21; Charif El Ouardi / 26; (Mohamed Belasri) / (32); (Mustapha Ouaziz) / (56)	76
5	Japan: Kazumi Honkawa / 17; Kazuhiro Kawauchi / 20; Yoichiro Kan / 27; Yasuyuki Watanabe / 38; (Takaomi Kawanami) / (41); (Tomoyuki Yamauchi) / (80)	102
6	Algeria: Yahia Azaidj / 16; Saad Ayeb / 24; Abdelhak Lebouazda / 30; Hakim Djadir / 39; (Aissa Menai) / (43); (Amar Dahbi) / (50)	109
7	United Kingdom: Keith Cullen / 19; Jon Gascoyne / 33; Steffan White / 55; Colin Walker / 58; (Kevin Toher) / (60); (David Robertson) / (76)	165
8	Spain: Javier Rodríguez / 34; Mateo Cañellas / 36; José Manuel Pérez / 48; Juan Luis Gómez / 57; (Javier Caballero) / (97); (Francisco Munuera) / (106)	175
9	Ireland: John Murray / 25; Mark Carroll / 35; Conor Holt / 88; Donal Gallagher / 90; (Alan O'Gorman) / (134)	238
10	United States: Michael Cox / 40; Teddy Mitchell / 53; Brian Clas / 64; Stuart Burnham / 84; (Kyle Armentrout) / (89); (Brant Armentrout) / (120)	241
11	Canada: Joseph Kibur / 31; Kevin Sullivan / 66; Janik Lambert / 78; Jeff Schiebler / 86; (Freeman Rogers) / (126); (Chris Halfyard) / (131)	261
12	France: David Bretel / 45; Thierry Breuil / 59; Cyrille Ballester / 67; Jocelyn Coste / 94; (Fabrice Chomaud) / (DNF); (Frederic Prini) / (DNF)	265
13	Czechoslovakia: Michal Kucera / 22; Martin Detka / 49; Petr Prokop / 95; Marcel Matanin / 114	280
14	Brazil: Marcel Rocha / 46; Edson Galvao / 61; Milson de Souza / 83; Emerson Vettori / 91	281
15	Italy: Danilo Goffi / 62; Leonardo Cavalieri Foschini / 71; Marco Orsi / 72; Alessandro Moltoni / 92; (Oscar Gilotti) / (96); (Massimiliano Centorame) / (111)	297
16	India: Jai Krishnan / 63; Ashok Kumar / 73; K.M. Chinnappa / 77; Kailash Mane / 101	314
17	Germany: Michael Gottschalk / 54; André Green / 82; Christian Fischer / 85; Michael Volker / 99; (Ulrich Steidl) / (113); (Thomas Greger) / (DNF)	320
18	Australia: Jason Rock / 47; Brett Cartwright / 75; Trent Wood / 98; Chris Unthank / 105; (Robert Ellis) / (117); (David Boddington) / (127)	325
19	Netherlands: Stan Rijken / 69; Robert Jan de Graaf / 74; Anton Huyben / 116; Marko Koers / 119; (Greg van Hest) / (122)	378
20	Belgium: Tom van Hooste / 70; Koen van Rie / 102; Gert Teniers / 104; Rik Courtens / 109; (Geert Eeckhoout) / (115); (Denis Renaurt) / (121)	385
21	Switzerland: Bernard Joliat / 87; Samuel Schmutz / 100; Oliver Wirz / 103; Othmar Bamert / 112; (Heinz Lehmann) / (129)	402
22	Sweden: Johan Swärdh / 93; Kim Runeson / 108; Jesper Skantz / 110; Arvid Levinsson / 118	429
23	Gibraltar: Richard Muscat / 123; Paul Ignacio / 124; Tyrone Cano / 128; Gareth Cano / 132; (Steven Roberts) / (133); (Darren McComb) / (136)	507

- Note: Athletes in parentheses did not score for the team result

== Participation ==
An unofficial count yields the participation of 143 athletes from 31 countries in the Junior men's race. This is in agreement with the official numbers as published.

- Algeria (6)
- Australia (6)
- Belgium (6)
- Brazil (4)
- Canada (6)
- Colombia (2)
- Czechoslovakia (4)
- Ethiopia (7)
- France (6)
- Germany (6)
- Gibraltar (6)
- Guam (3)
- India (4)
- Ireland (5)
- Italy (6)
- Japan (6)
- Kenya (5)
- Mauritius (3)
- Mexico (2)
- Morocco (6)
- Netherlands (5)
- New Zealand (3)
- Poland (1)
- Portugal (1)
- Soviet Union (3)
- Spain (6)
- Sweden (4)
- Switzerland (5)
- Tanzania (4)
- United Kingdom (6)
- United States (6)

== See also ==
- 1991 IAAF World Cross Country Championships – Senior men's race
- 1991 IAAF World Cross Country Championships – Senior women's race
- 1991 IAAF World Cross Country Championships – Junior women's race
