= 1991 IAAF World Cross Country Championships – Junior women's race =

Junior women's race at the 1991 IAAF World Cross Country Championships
- Organisers: IAAF
- Edition: 19th
- Date: March 24
- Host city: Antwerp, Antwerp Province, Belgium
- Venue: Linkeroever Racecourse
- Events: 1
- Distances: 4.435 km – Junior women
- Participation: 127 athletes from 30 nations

The Junior women's race at the 1991 IAAF World Cross Country Championships was held in Antwerp, Belgium, at the Linkeroever Racecourse on March 24, 1991. A report on the event was given in The New York Times.

Complete results, medallists, and the results of British athletes were published.

== Race results ==
=== Junior women's race (4.435 km) ===
==== Individual ====
Rank	Athlete	Country	Time
1st place, gold medalist(s)	Lydia Cheromei	Kenya	13:59
2nd place, silver medalist(s)	Jane Ekimat	Kenya	14:20
3rd place, bronze medalist(s)	Melody Fairchild	United States	14:28
4	Azumi Miyazaki	Japan	14:30
5	Gete Wami	Ethiopia	14:33
6	Catherine Kirui	Kenya	14:34
7	Hayley Haining	United Kingdom	14:36
8	Minori Hayakari	Japan	14:42
9	Lina Chesire	Kenya	14:43
10	Emebet Shiferaw	Ethiopia	14:45
11	Egigayehu Worku	Ethiopia	14:46
12	Akiko Kato	Japan	14:47
13	Suzy Walsham	Australia	14:49
14	Muluwork Kassa	Ethiopia	14:50
15	Paula Radcliffe	United Kingdom	14:50
16	Kore Alemu	Ethiopia	14:50
17	Danuta Marczyk	Poland	14:51
18	Sacha Stephens	Australia	14:53
19	Natsue Koikawa	Japan	14:56
20	Shiho Okayama	Japan	14:58
21	Carmen Naranjo	Ecuador	14:59
22	Michelle Lafleur	United States	15:01
23	Pamela Hunt	United States	15:02
24	Julie Beckhaus	Australia	15:05
25	Janeth Caizalitín	Ecuador	15:06
26	Sandra Ruales	Ecuador	15:07
27	Andrea Duke	United Kingdom	15:08
28	Genet Gebregiorgis	Ethiopia	15:09
29	Kay Gooch	New Zealand	15:11
30	Anja Smolders	Belgium	15:13
31	Mihaela Ciu	Romania	15:16
32	Dessy Muchimba	Zambia	15:17
33	Karen Whetton	United Kingdom	15:18
34	Ann Mwangi	Kenya	15:18
35	Gabriela Szabo	Romania	15:19
36	Angelika Grabianowska	Poland	15:20
37	Giovanna Tessitore	Italy	15:21
38	Addeh Mwamba	Zambia	15:21
39	Malin Ewerlöf	Sweden	15:23
40	Deena Drossin	United States	15:24
41	Hozumi Otani	Japan	15:24
42	Monica Tapia	Ecuador	15:24
43	Irina Volynskaya	Soviet Union	15:25
44	Michelle Dillon	Australia	15:26
45	Kate Anderson	Australia	15:26
46	Sonia Alvarez	Spain	15:26
47	Kathy Butler	Canada	15:28
48	Marta Kosmowska	Poland	15:29
49	Nathalie Braem	France	15:30
50	Wendy Ticehurst	Australia	15:32
51	Renáta Fülöp	Hungary	15:33
52	Carmen Fülop	Romania	15:33
53	Zhor El Kamch	Morocco	15:34
54	Annie Tembo	Zambia	15:34
55	Ana Gimeno	Spain	15:35
56	Szilvia Csoszánszky	Hungary	15:37
57	Edurne Fuente	Spain	15:38
58	Inna Kozina	Soviet Union	15:38
59	Patricia Lossouarn	France	15:39
60	Fabiana Bavaresco	Italy	15:39
61	Karen Harvey	Canada	15:40
62	Firmana Novelli	Italy	15:40
63	Juanita Sanchez	Mexico	15:41
64	Rachael Chileshe	Zambia	15:41
65	Stela Apetre	Romania	15:42
66	Najat Ouali	Morocco	15:42
67	Janice Turner	Jamaica	15:42
68	Celeste Susnis	United States	15:42
69	Natalia Requena	Spain	15:45
70	Constanze Effler	Germany	15:45
71	Nadia Ouaziz	Morocco	15:47
72	Fatima Zouhair	Morocco	15:49
73	Christine Taruvinga	Zimbabwe	15:49
74	Fleur Deconihout	France	15:49
75	Mónika Tóth	Hungary	15:49
76	Soledad Nieto	Ecuador	15:50
77	Sithabiso Taperwa	Zimbabwe	15:50
78	Kristin Liebich	Germany	15:51
79	Susana Rios	Spain	15:51
80	Grazyna Grzesikowska	Poland	15:52
81	Helena Sampaio	Portugal	15:52
82	Marie-Luce Romanens	Switzerland	15:52
83	Patrizia Ragno	Italy	15:52
84	Evette Turner	Jamaica	15:52
85	Claudia Stalder	Switzerland	15:52
86	Aruna Rani	India	15:52
87	Annick van Daele	Belgium	15:52
88	Denisa Costescu	Romania	15:55
89	Fatima Anbar	Morocco	15:57
90	Annie Chileshe	Zambia	15:58
91	Diana Montes	Spain	15:59
92	Daisy Colibry	France	16:00
93	Denise Vandeputte	Canada	16:01
94	Elisa Vagnini	Italy	16:02
95	Laureen Mumba	Zambia	16:02
96	Veronica López	Mexico	16:03
97	Andrea Bertoia	Canada	16:03
98	Lori Durward	Canada	16:04
99	Patricia Sainton	France	16:05
100	Korene Hinds	Jamaica	16:07
101	Mounia Aboulahcen	Morocco	16:08
102	Megan Thompson	United States	16:08
103	Monika Ganska	Poland	16:12
104	Tania Cevallos	Ecuador	16:13
105	Tanya Blake	United Kingdom	16:13
106	Nathalie Côté	Canada	16:14
107	Poonam Singh	India	16:15
108	Nicole Kresse	Germany	16:16
109	Helga Rauch	Italy	16:16
110	Mangal Phonde	India	16:16
111	Mariëlle Schiltmans	Netherlands	16:17
112	Anikó Behán	Hungary	16:18
113	Svenja Lütje	Germany	16:19
114	Maren Östringer	Germany	16:20
115	Petra Drajzajtlová	Czechoslovakia	16:25
116	Ann Noe	Belgium	16:25
117	Laurence Roobaert	Belgium	16:28
118	Ágnes Jakab	Hungary	16:35
119	Su Su-Ning	Chinese Taipei	16:38
120	Florina Pană	Romania	16:38
121	Veerle Dejaeghere	Belgium	16:39
122	Michelle Clarke	Jamaica	16:40
123	Rashmi Bhoyar	India	17:06
124	Ann Toelen	Belgium	17:22
—	Alemitu Bekele	Ethiopia	DNF
—	Gillian Stacey	United Kingdom	DNF
—	Helene Gilliet	France	DNF

==== Teams ====
Rank	Team	Points
1st place, gold medalist(s)	Kenya: Lydia Cheromei / 1; Jane Ekimat / 2; Catherine Kirui / 6; Lina Chesire / 9; (Ann Mwangi) / (34)	18
2nd place, silver medalist(s)	Ethiopia: Gete Wami / 5; Emebet Shiferaw / 10; Egigayehu Worku / 11; Muluwork Kassa / 14; (Kore Alemu) / (16); (Genet Gebregiorgis) / (28); (Alemitu Bekele) / (DNF)	40
3rd place, bronze medalist(s)	Japan: Azumi Miyazaki / 4; Minori Hayakari / 8; Akiko Kato / 12; Natsue Koikawa / 19; (Shiho Okayama) / (20); (Hozumi Otani) / (41)	43
4	United Kingdom: Hayley Haining / 7; Paula Radcliffe / 15; Andrea Duke / 27; Karen Whetton / 33; (Tanya Blake) / (105); (Gillian Stacey) / (DNF)	82
5	United States: Melody Fairchild / 3; Michelle Lafleur / 22; Pamela Hunt / 23; Deena Drossin / 40; (Celeste Susnis) / (68); (Megan Thompson) / (102)	88
6	Australia: Suzy Walsham / 13; Sacha Stephens / 18; Julie Beckhaus / 24; Michelle Dillon / 44; (Kate Anderson) / (45); (Wendy Ticehurst) / (50)	99
7	Ecuador: Carmen Naranjo / 21; Janeth Caizalitín / 25; Sandra Ruales / 26; Monica Tapia / 42; (Soledad Nieto) / (76); (Tania Cevallos) / (104)	114
8	Poland: Danuta Marczyk / 17; Angelika Grabianowska / 36; Marta Kosmowska / 48; Grazyna Grzesikowska / 80; (Monika Ganska) / (103)	181
9	Romania: Mihaela Ciu / 31; Gabriela Szabo / 35; Carmen Fülop / 52; Stela Apetre / 65; (Denisa Costescu) / (88); (Florina Pană) / (120)	183
10	Zambia: Dessy Muchimba / 32; Addeh Mwamba / 38; Annie Tembo / 54; Rachael Chileshe / 64; (Annie Chileshe) / (90); (Laureen Mumba) / (95)	188
11	Spain: Sonia Alvarez / 46; Ana Gimeno / 55; Edurne Fuente / 57; Natalia Requena / 69; (Susana Rios) / (79); (Diana Montes) / (91)	227
12	Italy: Giovanna Tessitore / 37; Fabiana Bavaresco / 60; Firmana Novelli / 62; Patrizia Ragno / 83; (Elisa Vagnini) / (94); (Helga Rauch) / (109)	242
13	Morocco: Zhor El Kamch / 53; Najat Ouali / 66; Nadia Ouaziz / 71; Fatima Zouhair / 72; (Fatima Anbar) / (89); (Mounia Aboulahcen) / (101)	262
14	France: Nathalie Braem / 49; Patricia Lossouarn / 59; Fleur Deconihout / 74; Daisy Colibry / 92; (Patricia Sainton) / (99); (Helene Gilliet) / (DNF)	274
15	Hungary: Renáta Fülöp / 51; Szilvia Csoszánszky / 56; Mónika Tóth / 75; Anikó Behán / 112; (Ágnes Jakab) / (118)	294
16	Canada: Kathy Butler / 47; Karen Harvey / 61; Denise Vandeputte / 93; Andrea Bertoia / 97; (Lori Durward) / (98); (Nathalie Côté) / (106)	298
17	Belgium: Anja Smolders / 30; Annick van Daele / 87; Ann Noe / 116; Laurence Roobaert / 117; (Veerle Dejaeghere) / (121); (Ann Toelen) / (124)	350
18	Germany: Constanze Effler / 70; Kristin Liebich / 78; Nicole Kresse / 108; Svenja Lütje / 113; (Maren Östringer) / (114)	369
19	Jamaica: Janice Turner / 67; Evette Turner / 84; Korene Hinds / 100; Michelle Clarke / 122	373
20	India: Aruna Rani / 86; Poonam Singh / 107; Mangal Phonde / 110; Rashmi Bhoyar / 123	426

- Note: Athletes in parentheses did not score for the team result

== Participation ==
An unofficial count yields the participation of 127 athletes from 30 countries in the Junior women's race. This is in agreement with the official numbers as published.

- Australia (6)
- Belgium (6)
- Canada (6)
- Chinese Taipei (1)
- Czechoslovakia (1)
- Ecuador (6)
- Ethiopia (7)
- France (6)
- Germany (5)
- Hungary (5)
- India (4)
- Italy (6)
- Jamaica (4)
- Japan (6)
- Kenya (5)
- Mexico (2)
- Morocco (6)
- Netherlands (1)
- New Zealand (1)
- Poland (5)
- Portugal (1)
- Romania (6)
- Soviet Union (2)
- Spain (6)
- Sweden (1)
- Switzerland (2)
- United Kingdom (6)
- United States (6)
- Zambia (6)
- Zimbabwe (2)

== See also ==
- 1991 IAAF World Cross Country Championships – Senior men's race
- 1991 IAAF World Cross Country Championships – Junior men's race
- 1991 IAAF World Cross Country Championships – Senior women's race
