= Berlin Ekiden =

International relay race from 1990 to 1992

The Brandenburg Gate in the 1990s, where the race finished

The Berlin Ekiden (Japanese: ベルリン駅伝, German: Ekiden-Lauf von Potsdam nach Berlin), also known as the Potsdam-Berlin Memorial Ekiden, was an international men's ekiden (marathon relay race) held in Berlin on November 1990, 1991, and 1992.

The competition was initiated in 1990. In retrospect, the 1992 edition was described as the beginning of then-19-year-old Haile Gebrselassie's running career, as part of the Ethiopian team, he beat the defending 5000 m Olympic champion Dieter Baumann by 30 seconds on the 4th leg.

The course record of 1:57:08 hours was set by Ethiopia in 1992.

== History ==
The race was predicated by the Staffellauf Potsdam–Berlin, a 25K run relay race between national-level clubs which was held from 1908 to 1969. Unlike the Staffellauf Potsdam–Berlin, the Berlin Ekiden was intended to be an international competition between teams representing countries. The race course runs through what was once the Berlin Wall, which would not have been possible if not for the fall of the Berlin Wall one year prior to the race beginning. It started at the Cecilienhof Palace and finished at the Brandenburg Gate. It was sponsored by Japanese organizations and broadcast by TV Asahi to Japanese audiences. After 1992, the race was discontinued due to declining Japanese interest in Germany as a country.

== Winners ==
Berlin Ekiden winning teams
Ed.	Date	Athletes	Split	Team	Time	Ref
1st	11 November 1990	Badilu Kibret	23:46	Ethiopia	1:57:54	
1st	11 November 1990	Abraham Assefa	21:42	Ethiopia	1:57:54	
1st	11 November 1990	Chala Kelile Tekelli	29:05	Ethiopia	1:57:54	
1st	11 November 1990	Fita Bayissa	13:42	Ethiopia	1:57:54	
1st	11 November 1990	Addis Abebe	29:38	Ethiopia	1:57:54	
2nd	10 November 1991	Dube Jillo	24:43	Ethiopia	1:58:20	
2nd	10 November 1991	Badilu Kibret	21:13	Ethiopia	1:58:20	
2nd	10 November 1991	Chala Kelile Tekelli	28:49	Ethiopia	1:58:20	
2nd	10 November 1991	Fita Bayissa	14:22	Ethiopia	1:58:20	
2nd	10 November 1991	Addis Abebe	29:13	Ethiopia	1:58:20	
3rd	8 November 1992	Fita Bayissa	23:39	Ethiopia	1:57:08	
3rd	8 November 1992	Abraham Assefa	21:13	Ethiopia	1:57:08	
3rd	8 November 1992	Worku Bikila	28:59	Ethiopia	1:57:08	
3rd	8 November 1992	Haile Gebrselassie	13:24	Ethiopia	1:57:08	
3rd	8 November 1992	Addis Abebe	29:48	Ethiopia	1:57:08	

== Stage bests ==
Best stage times per year
Year	Stage 1			Stage 2			Stage 3			Stage 4			Stage 5		
Year	Distance	Best time	Athlete	Distance	Best time	Athlete	Distance	Best time	Athlete	Distance	Best time	Athlete	Distance	Best time	Athlete
1990	8.5 km	23:46	Badilu Kibret (ETH)	7.8 km	21:41	Tim Gannon (USA)	10.3 km	29:05	Chala Kelile Tekelli (ETH)	5 km	13:42	Fita Bayissa (ETH)	10.595 km	29:38	Addis Abebe (ETH)
1991	8.5 km	24:41	Jesus Gonzalez (ESP)	7.8 km	20:52	William Sigei (KEN)	10.3 km	28:40	Stephan Freigang (GER)	5 km	14:22	Fita Bayissa (ETH)	10.595 km	29:13	Addis Abebe (ETH)
1992	8.5 km	23:39	Fita Bayissa (ETH)	7.8 km	21:13	Abraham Assefa (ETH)	10.3 km	28:53	Carsten Eich (GER)	5 km	13:24	Haile Gebrselassie (ETH)	10.595 km	29:48	Addis Abebe (ETH)
