= Joanne Thompson =

Joanne Thompson may refer to:

- Joanne Thompson (field hockey) (born 1965), English Olympian goalkeeper
- Joanne Thompson (politician), Canadian MP elected in 2021

== See also ==
- Joan Thompson (1890–1964), English author and suffragette
- Lisa Joann Thompson (born 1969), American dancer, choreographer, actress and model
- Joanna Thompson, British marathon runner in 1994 IAAF World Road Relay Championships
