= Athletics at the 1993 Summer Universiade – Women's 10,000 metres =

The women's 10,000 metres event at the 1993 Summer Universiade was held at the UB Stadium in Buffalo, United States on 15 July 1993.

== Results ==
Rank	Athlete	Nationality	Time	Notes
1st place, gold medalist(s)	Iulia Negură	Romania	32:22.09	
2nd place, silver medalist(s)	Suzana Ćirić	Independent Participants	32:26.68	
3rd place, bronze medalist(s)	Camelia Tecuţă	Romania	32:29.18	
4	Vikki McPherson	Great Britain	32:32.42	
5	Claudia Dreher	Germany	32:47.20	
6	Mónica Pont	Spain	32:51.33	
7	Natsue Koikawa	Japan	33:01.81	
8	Laurie Henes	United States	33:16.60	
9	Carmen Fuentes	Spain	33:38.53	
10	Vicky Mitchell	United States	34:33.26	
11	Serap Aktaş	Turkey	35:08.08	
12	Malika Kafil	Morocco	37:25.40	
13	Lee Hsiao-Chuan	Chinese Taipei	38:03.09	
14	Isabel Tum	Guatemala	38:10.55	

^{1}All athletes from Yugoslavia entered the games as "Independent Participants" due to United Nations sanctions against the country.
