= 1991 IAAF World Cross Country Championships =

- Organisers: IAAF
- Edition: 19th
- Date: March 24
- Host city: Antwerp, Province of Antwerp, Belgium
- Venue: Linkeroever Racecourse
- Events: 4
- Distances: 11.764 km – Senior men 8.415 km – Junior men 6.425 km – Senior women 4.435 km – Junior women
- Participation: 633 athletes from 51 nations

The 1991 IAAF World Cross Country Championships was held in Antwerp, Belgium, at the Linkeroever Racecourse on March 24, 1991. A report on the event was given in The New York Times.

Complete results for senior men, junior men, senior women, junior women, medallists, and the results of British athletes were published.

== Medallists ==
Event	Gold		Silver		Bronze	
Individual
Senior men (11.764 km)	Khalid Skah; Morocco	33:53	Moses Tanui; Kenya	33:54	Simon Karori; Kenya	33:54
Junior men (8.415 km)	Andrew Sambu; Tanzania	23:59	Mumo Muindi; Kenya	24:04	Fita Bayissa; Ethiopia	24:04
Senior women (6.425 km)	Lynn Jennings; United States	20:24	Derartu Tulu; Ethiopia	20:27	Liz McColgan; United Kingdom	20:28
Junior women (4.435 km)	Lydia Cheromei; Kenya	13:59	Jane Ekimat; Kenya	14:20	Melody Fairchild; United States	14:28
Team
Senior men	Kenya	38	Ethiopia	104	Spain	198
Junior men	Kenya	19	Ethiopia	26	Tanzania	54
Senior women	Kenya	36	Ethiopia	36	Soviet Union	48
Junior women	Kenya	18	Ethiopia	40	Japan	43

== Race results ==
=== Senior men's race (11.764 km) ===
Individual race
Rank	Athlete	Country	Time
1st place, gold medalist(s)	Khalid Skah	Morocco	33:53
2nd place, silver medalist(s)	Moses Tanui	Kenya	33:54
3rd place, bronze medalist(s)	Simon Karori	Kenya	33:54
4	Richard Chelimo	Kenya	33:57
5	Ondoro Osoro^{†}	Kenya	33:57
6	Stephenson Nyamau	Kenya	34:01
7	Chala Kelele	Ethiopia	34:06
8	Ezequiel Bitok^{†}	Kenya	34:19
9	Addis Abebe	Ethiopia	34:24
10	Hammou Boutayeb	Morocco	34:28
11	Boniface Merande	Kenya	34:31
12	William Mutwol	Kenya	34:32
Full results

^{†}: Athlete marked in the results list as nonscorer.

Teams
Rank	Team	Points
1st place, gold medalist(s)	Kenya: Moses Tanui / 2; Simon Karori / 3; Richard Chelimo / 4; Stephenson Nyamau / 6; Boniface Merande / 11; William Mutwol / 12; (William Koech) / (24); (Andrew Masai) / (34); (John Ngugi) / (DNF)	38
2nd place, silver medalist(s)	Ethiopia: Chala Kelele / 7; Addis Abebe / 9; Melese Feissa / 13; Tekeye Gebrselassie / 22; Bedile Kibret / 23; Habte Negash / 30; (Nigousse Urge) / (80); (Feyissa Abebe) / (91)	104
3rd place, bronze medalist(s)	Spain: Alejandro Gómez / 14; Martín Fiz / 20; José Carlos Adán / 25; José Manuel García / 31; Antonio Serrano / 37; Abel Antón / 71; (Antonio Prieto) / (98); (Constantino Esparcia) / (119); (Juan Carlos Paul) / (163)	198
4	Portugal	233
5	Morocco	265
6	United Kingdom	281
7	Italy	336
8	Soviet Union	409
Full results

- Note: Athletes in parentheses did not score for the team result

=== Junior men's race (8.415 km) ===
Individual race
Rank	Athlete	Country	Time
1st place, gold medalist(s)	Andrew Sambu	Tanzania	23:59
2nd place, silver medalist(s)	Mumo Muindi	Kenya	24:04
3rd place, bronze medalist(s)	Fita Bayissa	Ethiopia	24:04
4	Joseph Kibor	Kenya	24:09
5	Fekadu Degefu	Ethiopia	24:12
6	Josephat Kiprono N'Deti	Kenya	24:17
7	Ismael Kirui	Kenya	24:19
8	Haile Gebrselassie	Ethiopia	24:23
9	Mark Kipsang Too	Kenya	24:23
10	Desta Asgedom	Ethiopia	24:29
11	Abraham Assefa	Ethiopia	24:29
12	Francis Metta	Tanzania	25:07
Full results

Teams
Rank	Team	Points
1st place, gold medalist(s)	Kenya: Mumo Muindi / 2; Joseph Kibor / 4; Josephat Kiprono N'Deti / 6; Ismael Kirui / 7; (Mark Kipsang Too) / (9)	19
2nd place, silver medalist(s)	Ethiopia: Fita Bayissa / 3; Fekadu Degefu / 5; Haile Gebrselassie / 8; Desta Asgedom / 10; (Abraham Assefa) / (11); (Ayele Mezegebu) / (13); (Bedaso Turbe) / (DNF)	26
3rd place, bronze medalist(s)	Tanzania: Andrew Sambu / 1; Francis Metta / 12; Onesmo Ludago / 18; Juma Ninga / 23	54
4	Morocco	76
5	Japan	102
6	Algeria	109
7	United Kingdom	165
8	Spain	175
Full results

- Note: Athletes in parentheses did not score for the team result

=== Senior women's race (6.425 km) ===
Individual race
Rank	Athlete	Country	Time
1st place, gold medalist(s)	Lynn Jennings	United States	20:24
2nd place, silver medalist(s)	Derartu Tulu	Ethiopia	20:27
3rd place, bronze medalist(s)	Liz McColgan	United Kingdom	20:28
4	Luchia Yeshak	Ethiopia	20:29
5	Jane Ngotho	Kenya	20:30
6	Albertina Dias	Portugal	20:40
7	Susan Sirma	Kenya	20:46
8	Yelena Romanova	Soviet Union	20:50
9	Margaret Ngotho	Kenya	20:55
10	Marcianne Mukamurenzi	Rwanda	20:57
11	Natalya Sorokivskaya	Soviet Union	20:57
12	Fatuma Roba	Ethiopia	21:01
Full results

Teams
Rank	Team	Points
1st place, gold medalist(s)	Kenya: Jane Ngotho / 5; Susan Sirma / 7; Margaret Ngotho / 9; Pauline Konga / 15; (Hellen Chepngeno) / (46)	36
2nd place, silver medalist(s)	Ethiopia: Derartu Tulu / 2; Luchia Yeshak / 4; Fatuma Roba / 12; Merima Denboba / 18; (Tigist Moreda) / (20); (Berhane Adere) / (34)	36
3rd place, bronze medalist(s)	Soviet Union: Yelena Romanova / 8; Natalya Sorokivskaya / 11; Nadezhda Galyamova / 13; Marina Rodchenkova / 16; (Olga Nazarkina) / (23); (Nadezhda Ilyina) / (24)	48
4	United States	77
5	United Kingdom	104
6	Portugal	145
7	Romania	148
8	France	175
Full results

- Note: Athletes in parentheses did not score for the team result

=== Junior women's race (4.435 km) ===
Individual race
Rank	Athlete	Country	Time
1st place, gold medalist(s)	Lydia Cheromei	Kenya	13:59
2nd place, silver medalist(s)	Jane Ekimat	Kenya	14:20
3rd place, bronze medalist(s)	Melody Fairchild	United States	14:28
4	Azumi Miyazaki	Japan	14:30
5	Gete Wami	Ethiopia	14:33
6	Catherine Kirui	Kenya	14:34
7	Hayley Haining	United Kingdom	14:36
8	Minori Hayakari	Japan	14:42
9	Lina Chesire	Kenya	14:43
10	Emebet Shiferaw	Ethiopia	14:45
11	Egigayehu Worku	Ethiopia	14:46
12	Akiko Kato	Japan	14:47
Full results

Teams
Rank	Team	Points
1st place, gold medalist(s)	Kenya: Lydia Cheromei / 1; Jane Ekimat / 2; Catherine Kirui / 6; Lina Chesire / 9; (Ann Mwangi) / (34)	18
2nd place, silver medalist(s)	Ethiopia: Gete Wami / 5; Emebet Shiferaw / 10; Egigayehu Worku / 11; Muluwork Kassa / 14; (Kore Alemu) / (16); (Genet Gebregiorgis) / (28); (Alemitu Bekele) / (DNF)	40
3rd place, bronze medalist(s)	Japan: Azumi Miyazaki / 4; Minori Hayakari / 8; Akiko Kato / 12; Natsue Koikawa / 19; (Shiho Okayama) / (20); (Hozumi Otani) / (41)	43
4	United Kingdom	82
5	United States	88
6	Australia	99
7	Ecuador	114
8	Poland	181
Full results

- Note: Athletes in parentheses did not score for the team result

== Medal table (unofficial) ==
Rank	Nation	Gold	Silver	Bronze	Total
1	Kenya	5	3	1	9
2	Tanzania	1	0	1	2
2	United States	1	0	1	2
4	Morocco	1	0	0	1
5	Ethiopia	0	5	1	6
6	Great Britain	0	0	1	1
6	Japan	0	0	1	1
6	Soviet Union	0	0	1	1
6	Spain	0	0	1	1
Totals (9 entries)		8	8	8	24

- Note: Totals include both individual and team medals, with medals in the team competition counting as one medal.

== Participation ==
An unofficial count yields the participation of 633 athletes from 51 countries. This is in agreement with the official numbers as published.

- Algeria (6)
- Angola (1)
- Argentina (7)
- Aruba (2)
- Australia (25)
- Belgium (27)
- Botswana (3)
- Brazil (16)
- Burundi (1)
- Canada (26)
- Chile (1)
- Chinese Taipei (4)
- Colombia (5)
- Czechoslovakia (14)
- Denmark (3)
- Ecuador (6)
- Ethiopia (28)
- France (27)
- Germany (14)
- Gibraltar (6)
- Guam (4)
- Hungary (5)
- India (19)
- Iran (3)
- Ireland (18)
- Italy (27)
- Jamaica (4)
- Japan (22)
- Kenya (27)
- Madagascar (1)
- Mauritius (13)
- Mexico (15)
- Morocco (19)
- Namibia (1)
- Netherlands (19)
- New Zealand (19)
- Norway (7)
- Poland (7)
- Portugal (17)
- Romania (12)
- Rwanda (2)
- Soviet Union (20)
- Spain (27)
- Sweden (6)
- Switzerland (16)
- Tanzania (6)
- United Kingdom (28)
- United States (27)
- U.S. Virgin Islands (2)
- Zambia (11)
- Zimbabwe (7)

== See also ==
- 1991 IAAF World Cross Country Championships – Senior men's race
- 1991 IAAF World Cross Country Championships – Junior men's race
- 1991 IAAF World Cross Country Championships – Senior women's race
- 1991 IAAF World Cross Country Championships – Junior women's race
- 1991 in athletics (track and field)
