= Hiroyama =

Hiroyama (written: 弘山 or 廣山) is a Japanese surname. Notable people with the surname include:

- Harumi Hiroyama (弘山 晴美, born 1968), Japanese long-distance runner
- Nozomi Hiroyama (廣山 望, born 1977), Japanese footballer
