= 1997 World Championships in Athletics – Women's 5000 metres =

These are the official results of the Women's 5,000 metres event at the 1997 World Championships in Athens, Greece. There were a total number of 42 participating athletes, with two qualifying heats and the final held on Saturday 1997-08-09.

== Results ==
=== First round ===
7 August 1997

Heat	Rank	Name	Result	Notes
1	1	Gabriela Szabo (ROU)	15:26.62 Q	
1	2	Paula Radcliffe (GBR)	15:27.25 Q	
2	3	Fernanda Ribeiro (POR)	15:27.30 Q	
1	4	Harumi Hiroyama (JPN)	15:27.75 Q	
1	5	Roberta Brunet (ITA)	15:29.03 Q	
2	6	Liu Jianying (CHN)	15:29.28 Q	PB
1	7	Ayelech Worku (ETH)	15:29.37 Q	
1	8	Wei Li (CHN)	15:29.62 Q	
1	9	Libbie Hickman (USA)	15:30.56 q	SB
2	10	Lydia Cheromei (KEN)	15:32.00 Q	
2	11	Merima Denboba (ETH)	15:32.01 Q	
1	12	Gunhild Hall (NOR)	15:32.13 q	
2	13	Naoko Takahashi (JPN)	15:32.25 Q	
2	14	Yuko Kawakami (JPN)	15:32.71 Q	
1	15	Kate Anderson (AUS)	15:36.16 q	
1	16	Yelena Kopytova (RUS)	15:37.19	PB
2	17	Sonia O'Sullivan (IRL)	15:40.82	
2	18	Stela Olteanu (ROU)	15:40.86	
1	19	Adriana Fernandez (MEX)	15:41.55	
2	20	Olivera Jevtić (YUG)	15:43.76	
1	21	Melody Fairchild (USA)	15:47.66	
2	22	Chrystosomia Iakovou (GRE)	15:51.14	
1	23	Marina Bastos (POR)	15:54.01	
2	24	Restituta Joseph (TAN)	15:55.22	NR
1	25	Valerie Vaughan (IRL)	15:57.58	
1	26	Zohra Ouaziz (MAR)	15:58.84	
2	27	Amy Rudolph (USA)	16:00.87	
1	28	Genet Gebregiorgis (ETH)	16:04.40	SB
1	29	Laurence Duquenoy (FRA)	16:06.02	
2	30	Una English (IRL)	16:07.09	
2	31	Jelena Chelnova (LAT)	16:27.63	
2	32	Helena Javornik (SLO)	16:28.38	
1	33	Justine Nahimana (BDI)	17:21.77	
1	34	Nebiat Habtemariam (ERI)	18:26.50	
1	35	Zalia Aliou (TOG)	18:34.45	NR
1	36	Martha Portobanco (NCA)	19:08.44	
2	—	Anne Hare (NZL)	DNF	
2	—	Kristina da Fonseca-Wollheim (GER)	DNF	
1	—	Maysa Matrood (IRQ)	DNS	
1	—	Elana Meyer (RSA)	DNS	
2	—	Carol Howe (CAN)	DNS	
2	—	Annemari Sandell (FIN)	DNS	

=== Final ===
9 August 1997

Rank	Name	Result	Notes
Gold medal	Gabriela Szabo (ROM)	14:57.68	
Silver medal	Roberta Brunet (ITA)	14:58.29	SB
Bronze medal	Fernanda Ribeiro (POR)	14:58.85	
4	Paula Radcliffe (GBR)	15:01.74	
5	Lydia Cheromei (KEN)	15:07.88	
6	Liu Jianying (CHN)	15:10.64	PB
7	Libbie Hickman (USA)	15:11.15	PB
8	Harumi Hiroyama (JPN)	15:21.19	
9	Wei Li (CHN)	15:24.04	
10	Merima Denboba (ETH)	15:27.76	
11	Kate Anderson (AUS)	15:27.78	
12	Ayelech Worku (ETH)	15:28.07	
13	Naoko Takahashi (JPN)	15:32.83	
15	Gunhild Halle Haugen (NOR)	15:37.85	
16	Yuko Kawakami (JPN)	15:45.48	

== See also ==
- 1992 Women's Olympic 3,000 metres (Barcelona)
- 1993 Women's World Championships 3,000 metres (Stuttgart)
- 1994 Women's European Championships 3,000 metres (Helsinki)
- 1995 Women's World Championships 5,000 metres (Gothenburg)
- 1996 Women's Olympic 5,000 metres (Atlanta)
- 1998 Women's European Championships 5,000 metres (Budapest)
- 1999 Women's World Championships 5,000 metres (Seville)
- 2000 Women's Olympic 5,000 metres (Sydney)
