= Joaquim Pinheiro =

Portuguese runner

Joaquim Pinheiro (born December 20, 1960) is a retired Portuguese runner.

He competed in the marathon at the 1991 World Championships and the 1992 Summer Olympics, both times without finishing the race.

== International competitions ==
Year	Competition	Venue	Position	Event	Notes
Representing Portugal
1984	World Cross Country Championships	New York City, United States	84th	Long race (12.086 km)	35:00
1984	World Cross Country Championships	New York City, United States	3rd	Team	223 pts
1986	Ibero-American Championships	Havana, Cuba	6th	5000m	13:58.08
1986	Ibero-American Championships	Havana, Cuba	2nd	10,000m	29:59.71
1988	World Cross Country Championships	Auckland, New Zealand	26th	Long race (12 km)	36:25
1988	World Cross Country Championships	Auckland, New Zealand	9th	Team	336 pts
1990	European Championships	Split, Yugoslavia	—	Marathon	DNF
1991	World Cross Country Championships	Antwerp, Belgium	16th	Long race (11.764 km)	34:40
1991	World Cross Country Championships	Antwerp, Belgium	4th	Team	233 pts
1992	Venice Marathon	Venice, Italy	1st	Marathon	2:13:33
1993	World Cross Country Championships	Amorebieta, Spain	25th	Long race (11.75 km)	34:08
1993	World Cross Country Championships	Amorebieta, Spain	3rd	Team	167 pts
1993	World Championships	Stuttgart, Germany	—	Marathon	DNF
1995	World Championships	Gothenburg, Sweden	—	Marathon	DNF
1996	Lake Biwa Marathon	Ōtsu, Japan	1st	Marathon	2:09:32
