= Lydia Cheromei =

Kenyan long-distance runner

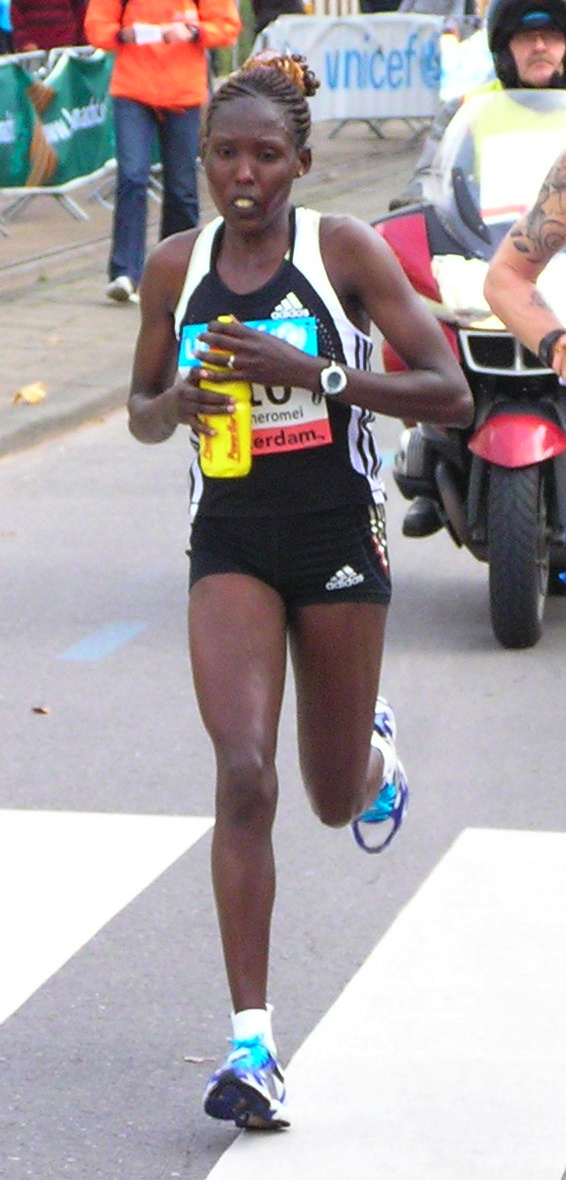
- Lydia Cheromei, Amsterdam 2008

Medal record

Women's athletics

Representing Kenya

African Championships
Silver medal – second place	1992 Belle Vue Harel	10,000
Silver medal – second place	1993 Durban	10,000 m

Lydia Cheromei (born 15 May 1977, in Baringo District) is a Kenyan athlete born into a family of athletes. She specialises in long distance running. She rose to fame at the age of thirteen with a win in the junior race at the IAAF World Cross Country Championships. She took some years away from competition, citing burnout, and returned in the mid-nineties, making an appearance at the 1996 Atlanta Olympics.

Cheromei enjoyed success on the roads, taking wins at the Saint Silvester Road Race and came sixth on the track at the 2000 Summer Olympics. She did not compete from 2001 to 2004 due to private problems, and missed another two years of competition after a positive doping test in 2006.

Cheromei returned in 2008 and began competing in marathons, followed by the Italian Coach Gabriele Nicola, taking a debut win at the Amsterdam Marathon.

== Personal life ==
Lydia Cheromei is the fifth-born of seven children. She shares her passion for running with her parents and brothers Joseph, Jeremiah and David. Her mother used to run six-minute miles, while her father in 2010 was still running seven-minute miles at the age of 72. Both her brothers Joseph and Jeremiah have represented Kenya at the Olympics. David Cheromei says he was inspired to take racing seriously so he would not have to be embarrassed about being beaten by his sister. Fellow athlete and world record holder Paul Tergat is her cousin. In September 2006 Lydia gave birth to a daughter, Faith Chelagat.

== Career ==
=== Junior and burnout ===
Cheromei was bronze medalist at the World Junior Championships and won the junior category of the World Cross Country Championships in 1991 at the age of 13. She won Kenyan trials for the 1991 World Championships, but was considered too young to compete in Tokyo. She was at the time coached by Sister Christine Heverin of Singore Girls Secondary School.

She was mostly inactive between 1994–1997, since the young runner had allegedly burnt out. She made a comeback but had another three-year break until 2004 due to personal problems.

=== Return to running and doping ban ===
Cheromei has three victories (1999, 2000 and 2004) at Saint Silvester Road Race held annually in Brazil. She won the 2004 Zevenheuvelenloop by running 47:02, the second best 15K time ever.

In 2006 Cheromei was found guilty of clomiphene doping. The sample was delivered on 24 February 2005 in an out-of-competition test in Eldoret. She received an IAAF suspension from May 2005 to May 2007. She claimed she was taking the substance under the prescription of her doctor as she was undergoing fertility treatment at the time of testing. The ban remained as she did not inform the relevant authorities of the information.

=== Marathon running ===
Cheromei won the 2008 Rotterdam Half Marathon with a course record of 68:35; the previous record (69:13) had been set by herself in 2004 when she also won the event.

She had a successful marathon debut by winning the 2008 Amsterdam Marathon and timing 2.25.27. In the 2009 Rotterdam Marathon she finished 2nd behind Nailya Yulamanova of Russia.

She ran at the 2011 Dubai Marathon and secured second place behind Aselefech Mergia – her time of 2:23:01 marked an improvement upon her previous best of more than three minutes. She broke the course record at the Prague Half Marathon in April and her winning time of 1:07:33 marked a career improvement for the distance of well over a minute. The following month she made a successful return to the city, winning the Prague Marathon in a course record time of 2:22:34, again a personal best. In October she won the Marseille-Cassis Classic with a course record run of 1:08:23 hours, but managed only fifth at the Delhi Half Marathon the following month.

She was among the pre-race favourites at the 2012 Dubai Marathon in January, but finished in sixth place. However, she still improved her personal best by over a minute with a run of 2:21:30 hours in a fast field of women. She was the favourite to defend her title at the 2012 Prague Half Marathon and produced a personal best of 1:07:26 hours, but was beaten by Joyce Chepkirui. Returning to the Prague Marathon, she entered as the favourite and maintained a fast pace until 30K, but eventually dropped out a few kilometres from the finish suffering from a leg injury. She placed fourth at both the Lille Half Marathon and the 2012 IAAF World Half Marathon Championships, which was her first international appearance in eight years. She ran a course record of 2:23:07 to win the Yokohama Women's Marathon in November.

She entered the 2013 Prague Marathon in the hope of emulating her win two years previously, but a hip problem left her in sixth place.

== Achievements ==
Year	Competition	Venue	Position	Event	Notes
Representing Kenya
1990	World Junior Championships	Plovdiv, Bulgaria	3rd	10,000 m	33:20.83
1991	World Cross Country Championships	Antwerp, Belgium	1st	Junior race (4.435 km)	13:59
1992	World Cross Country Championships	Boston, United States	3rd	Junior race (4.005 km)	13:43
1992	Olympic Games	Barcelona, Spain	30th (h)	10,000 m	33:34.05
1992	World Junior Championships	Seoul, South Korea	4th	10,000m	33:01.99
1995	IAAF Grand Prix Final	Monaco	7th	3000 m	8:48.46
1996	Olympic Games	Atlanta, United States	heats	5000 m	15:49.85
1997	World Cross Country Championships	Turin, Italy	11th	Long race (6.6 km)	21:34
1997	World Championships	Athens, Greece	5th	5000 m	15:07.88
1997	IAAF Grand Prix Final	Fukuoka, Japan	2nd	5000 m	15:15.64
2000	World Cross Country Championships	Vilamoura, Portugal	4th	Long race (8.08 km)	26:02
2000	Olympic Games	Sydney	6th	5000 m	14:47.35
2000	IAAF Grand Prix Final	Doha, Qatar	4th	3000 m	8:54.85
2001	World Cross Country Championships	Ostend, Belgium	3rd	Long race (7.7 km)	28:07
2004	World Half Marathon Championships	New Delhi, India	2nd	Half marathon	1:09:00
2008	Amsterdam Marathon	Amsterdam, Netherlands	1st	Marathon	2:25:57
2012	World Half Marathon Championships	Kavarna, Bulgaria	4th	Half marathon	1:09:13

=== Personal bests ===
- 1500 metres – 4:13.06 min (2000)
- 3000 metres – 8:29.14 min (2000)
- 5000 metres – 14:46.72 min (1997)
- 10,000 metres – 31:41.09 min (1992)
- 10 kilometres – 31:33 min (2004)
- 15 kilometres – 47:02 min (2004)
- Half marathon – 1:07:26 hrs (2012)
- Marathon – 2:21:30 hrs (2012)

== See also ==
- List of sportspeople sanctioned for doping offences

Sporting positions
Preceded by Incumbent	Rotterdam Women's Half Marathon Winner; 2004	Succeeded by (Ethiopia) Bezunesh Bekele
Preceded by (Ethiopia) Mestawet Tufa	Zevenheuvelenloop Women's Winner (15 km); 2004	Succeeded by (Ethiopia) Berhane Adere
