= Olika Adugna =

Ethiopian long-distance runner and marathon winner

Personal information
- Nationality: Ethiopian
- Born: 12 September 1999 (age 26)

Sport
- Sport: Athletics
- Event(s): Long-distance running, Marathon

Olika Adugna (born 12 September 1999) is an Ethiopian long-distance runner specializing in the marathon. He is best known for winning the 2020 Dubai Marathon in his marathon debut.

== Career ==
Olika Adugna first gained international recognition in junior events, notably placing fifth in the 10,000 metres at the 2018 IAAF World U20 Championships in Tampere, Finland, where he recorded his personal best of 28:39.67.

Later in 2018, Adugna secured his first significant international victory at the Marseille-Cassis 20 km road race in France, finishing in 1:00:29. This race is where he also achieved his personal best for the half marathon distance.

His biggest career breakthrough came on 24 January 2020, when he won the 2020 Dubai Marathon in his marathon debut. He crossed the finish line in a time of 2:06:15, leading an unprecedented 11 runners to finish under 2:07:00 in a single race. This victory marked him as a promising new talent in marathon running.

Following his Dubai victory, Adugna has continued to compete in major marathons. In 2022, he finished fifth at the Paris Marathon with a time of 2:06:27. He also placed fourth at the Seoul International Marathon in 2023, clocking 2:06:29.

== Personal bests ==
- Marathon – 2:06:15 (Dubai, 24 January 2020)
- Half Marathon – 1:00:29 (Marseille, 28 October 2018)
- 10,000 metres – 28:39.67 (Tampere, 10 July 2018)
