= Marseille-Cassis Classique Internationale =

Annual half marathon in France

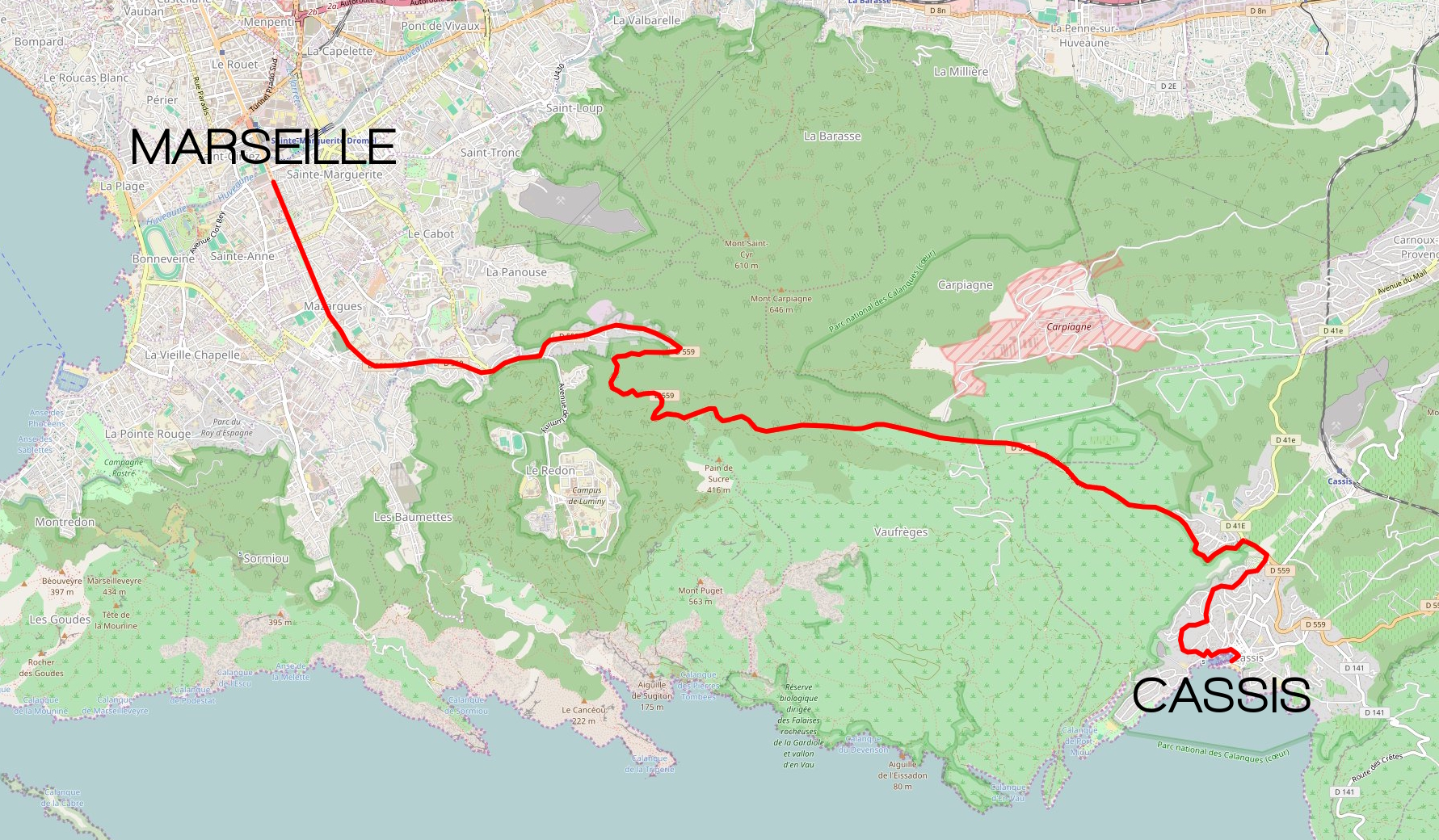
- Marseille-Cassis race course
- Date: late October
- Location: Marseille–Cassis, France
- Event type: Road
- Distance: 20km
- Established: 1979
- Course records: Men: (Ethiopia) Atsedu Tsegay 58:11; Women: (Kenya) Edith Chelimo 1:05:58
- Website: Marseille-Cassis 20KM
- Participants: 18,762 (2018)

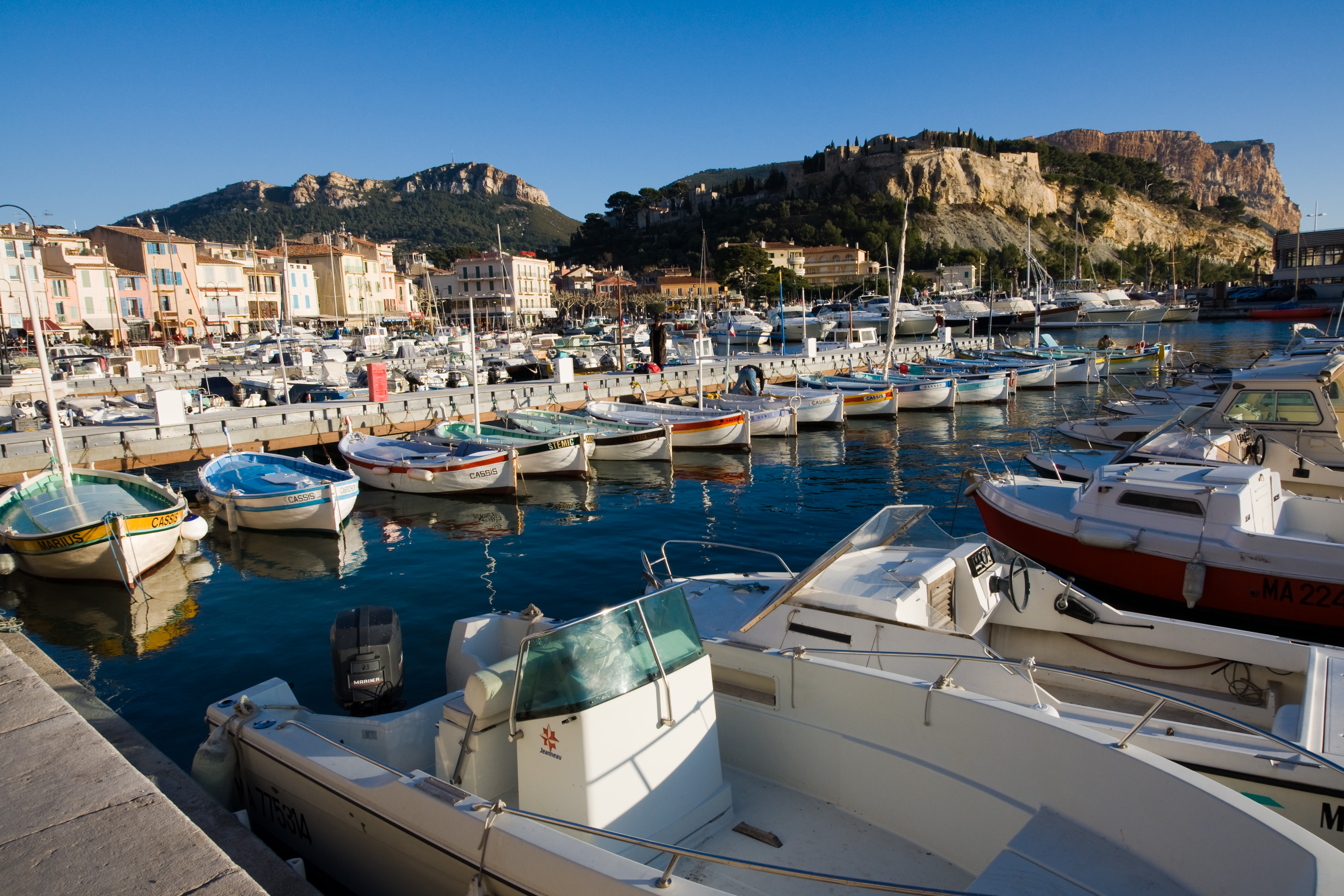
Runners descend the Col de la Gineste to reach the finishing point at the port in Cassis

The Marseille-Cassis Classique Internationale (Occitan: Classica Internacional la Marselha-Cassís) is an annual half marathon which follows a course from Marseille to Cassis in France during the last weekend in October. It has the silver label of the IAAF Road Race Label Events and is thus among the ten more prestigious half marathon races in the world. First organised by the SCO Sainte-Marguerite sports club in 1979, the event has grown into a large international competition, with around 20,000 runners competing every year. The course distance of 20,308 metres falls slightly short of the true half marathon distance (21,097.5 m). Since 2012, the course has been shortened by 308 metres so the total distance of the course became exactly 20 kilometres. Still, the race is made more difficult by a long 327 m rise up a hill—the Col de la Gineste—at the midpoint of the course, which eventually follows back down into the port of Cassis. The annual race is usually held in the month of October.

The course records are held by Atsedu Tsegay, who has the men's race record with 58:11 minutes, and Edith Chelimo, who has the women's record with 1:05:58.

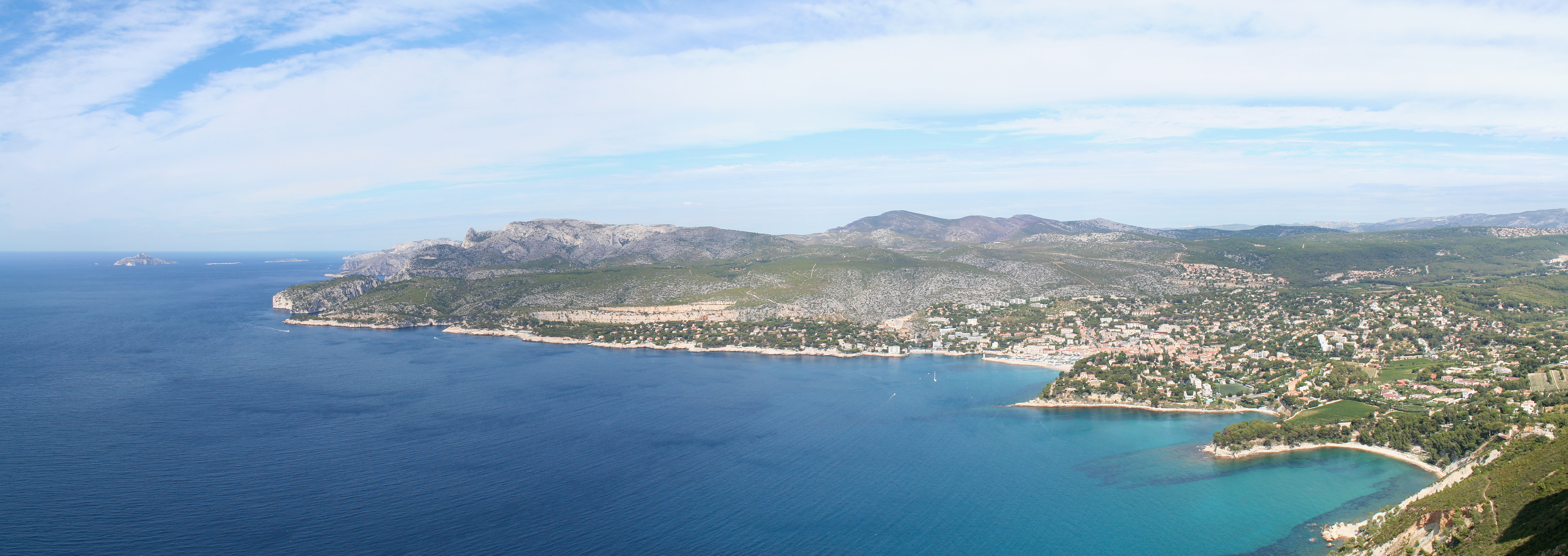
A view of the calanques of Marseille

There are also two other races which complement the main competition: first organised in 1990, the "L'Autre Marseille-Cassis" (The Other Marseille-Cassis in English) is a mountain hike which negotiates the Massif des Calanques area. The second complementary competition is a racewalk, launched in 2006, which seeks to celebrate the sports festival through an alternative sporting means.

== List of winners ==
Key: Course record

Edition	Year	Men's winner	Time (h:m:s)	Women's winner	Time (h:m:s)
1st	1979	Alain Angelvy (FRA)	1:15:54	Fabienne Rai (FRA)	1:34:45
2nd	1980	Jean-Michel Dirringer (FRA)	1:07:42	Fabienne Rai (FRA)	1:27:02
3rd	1981	Jean-Pierre Louvet (FRA)	1:07:56	Fabienne Rai (FRA)	1:22:30
4th	1982	Jean-Pierre Louvet (FRA)	1:07:56	Fabienne Rai (FRA)	1:31:00
5th	1983	Christophe Jalaguier (FRA)	1:07:56	P. Deneuville (FRA)	1:22:00
6th	1984	Jean-Pierre Louvet (FRA)	1:07:37	Roseline Vastine (FRA)	1:20:30
7th	1985	Tony Martins (FRA)	1:08:17	Frederique Voragen (FRA)	1:27:00
8th	1986	Tony Martins (FRA)	1:05:45	Fabienne Rai (FRA)	1:23:00
9th	1987	Nigel Adams (WAL)	1:04:20	El-Hassania Darami (MAR)	1:16:34
10th	1988	Michael Heilmann (FRG)	1:01:52	El-Hassania Darami (MAR)	1:16:49
11th	1989	Michael Heilmann (FRG)	1:03:21	Ceri Pritchard (WAL)	1:13:39
12th	1990	Tony Martins (FRA)	1:01:29	Ceri Pritchard (WAL)	1:12:57
13th	1991	Joseph Vibostok (TCH)	1:03:20	Heléna Barócsi (HUN)	1:11:23
14th	1992	Bruno Leger (FRA)	1:02:12	Olga Parluc (CIS)	1:13:19
15th	1993	Sammy Bitok (KEN)	1:02:55	Alena Peterková (CZE)	1:12:17
16th	1994	Bernard Mvuyekure (BDI)	1:01:13	Iulia Negura (ROU)	1:10:32
17th	1995	Laban Chege (KEN)	1:02:00	Marina Belyayeva (RUS)	1:12:54
18th	1996	Laban Chege (KEN)	1:00:54	Irina Kasakova (FRA)	1:11:00
19th	1997	John Gwako (KEN)	1:00:27	Alla Zhilyaeva (RUS)	1:10:34
20th	1998	Hendrick Ramaala (RSA)	1:00:36	Ruth Kutol (KEN)	1:10:33
21st	1999	Phaustin Baha Sulle (TAN)	1:00:24	Berhane Adere (ETH)	1:09:45
22nd	2000	David Makori (KEN)	1:00:49	Susan Chepkemei (KEN)	1:08:30
23rd	2001	David Makori (KEN)	1:01:11	Magdaline Chemjor (KEN)	1:09:52
24th	2002	James Kwambai (KEN)	59:01	Banuelia Mrashani (TAN)	1:08:38
25th	2003	Paul Biwott (KEN)	1:00:01	Teyba Erkesso (ETH)	1:10:07
26th	2004	Lawrence Kiprotich (KEN)	1:02:13	Marina Ivanova (RUS)	1:12:08
27th	2005	William Chebor (KEN)	1:00:37	Fatiha Fauvel-Klilech (FRA)	1:12:50
28th	2006	John Kyalo (KEN)	1:00:36	Martha Komu (KEN)	1:12:34
29th	2007	Wilson Chebet (KEN)	59:24	Anne Bererwe (KEN)	1:09:58
30th	2008	Wilson Chebet (KEN)	1:00:00	Iness Chenonge (KEN)	1:09:39
31st	2009	Dieudonné Disi (RWA)	1:00:21	Meseret Mengistu (ETH)	1:10:35
32nd	2010	Philemon Limo (KEN)	1:01:35	Diane Chepkemoi (KEN)	1:10:36
33rd	2011	Atsedu Tsegay (ETH)	58:11	Lydia Cheromei (KEN)	1:08:23
34th	2012	Edwin Kipyego (KEN)	58:16	Mercy Kibarus (KEN)	1:07:58
35th	2013	Mule Wasihun (ETH)	1:00:09	Josephine Chepkoech (KEN)	1:10:03
36th	2014	Titus Mbishei (KEN)	59:12	Peres Jepchirchir (KEN)	1:10:04
37th	2015	Edwin Kipyego (KEN)	57:18*	Peres Jepchirchir (KEN)	1:06:01*
38th	2016	Henry Kiplagat (KEN)	59:28	Joyciline Jepkosgei (KEN)	1:07:02
39th	2017	Jemal Yimer (ETH)	59:16	Edith Chelimo (KEN)	1:05:58
40th	2018	Olika Adugna (ETH)	1:00:29	Gete Alemayehu (ETH)	1:08:46
41st	2019	Olika Adugna (ETH)	1:01:10	Brillian Kipkoech (KEN)	1:07:54
42nd	2021	Felix Bour (FRA)	1:01:55	Mekdes Woldu (ERI)	1:13:24

- All winners information taken from official website
- (*)Course records not valid due to race shortened by about 400 metres in the days before the race.
