= Atsedu Tsegay =

Ethiopian long-distance runner

Atsedu Tsegay Tesfay (born 17 December 1991) is an Ethiopian professional long-distance runner. In 2012, he won Prague Half Marathon in a time of 58:47 — the best half marathon performance of the year and an Ethiopian record.

His first major international appearance was at the 2010 World Junior Championships in Athletics, where he placed sixth in the 5000 metres final. In 2011 he won the Marseille-Cassis Classique Internationale with a course record of 58:11 minutes and the Corrida de Langueux in another course record of 27:46 minutes. He was also runner-up at the Rabat Half Marathon that year.

At the start of the following year he took the bronze medal at the 2012 African Cross Country Championships. He also won the São Silvestre de Luanda at the end of that year. In 2013 he had limited outings but placed fourth at the Lille Half Marathon and won both the Great Ethiopian Run and the Delhi Half Marathon (breaking the course record at the latter race).

== Personal bests ==
- 5000 metres – 13:51.0 min (2011)
- 10,000 metres – 27:28.11 min (2013)
- 10K run – 27:46 min (2011)
- Half marathon – 58:47 min (2012)
