= Justine Nahimana =

Burundian long-distance runner

Justine Nahimana (born 6 August 1979) is a Burundian athlete who specialized in long-distance running. She was the first woman to represent Burundi at the Olympics.

At the age of 16, Nahimana was the only female competitor from Burundi to compete at the 1996 Summer Olympics in Atlanta when she entered the 10000 metres, she finished her heat in 18th place so didn't qualify for the final. In 1997, she competed in the 1997 World Championships in Athletics in Athens, where she came 18th again in her heat in the 5000 metres and didn't reach the final.
