= José Carlos Adán =

Spanish long-distance runner

José Carlos Adán Arias (born 22 July 1967, in Vigo) is a retired Spanish long-distance runner who specialized in cross-country running. He was twice a team bronze medallist at the IAAF World Cross Country Championships and his highest individual placing was 18th, achieved in 1995. In total, he made twelve appearances at the competition, from 1986 to 2002. He also represented his country at the 1993 World Championships in Athletics, placing 16th in the 10,000 metres, and at the 1992 Barcelona Olympics, being eliminated in the 10,000 m heats. He twice competed at the IAAF World Half Marathon Championships (1997 and 2001).

Adán placed in the top seven at the European Cross Country Championships on three occasions, his best finish of fourth coming in 1994. He shared in the team's silver medals at that competition in 1994 and 2000, before claiming the team title alongside Antonio David Jiménez at the 2001 European Cross Country Championships. At the 1994 European Athletics Championships, his sole outing at that event, he placed sixth in the 5000 metres.

He came third for Spain in the 10,000 m at the 1993 European Cup, and was a silver medallist in the 5000 m at the 1990 Ibero-American Championships in Athletics. He won the third edition of Iberian 10,000 Metres Championships.

== International competitions ==
Year	Competition	Venue	Position	Event	Notes
Representing Spain
1990	Ibero-American Championships	Manaus, Brazil	2nd	5000m	13:56.69
1991	World Cross Country Championships	Antwerp, Belgium	25th	Long race (11.764 km)	34:56
1991	World Cross Country Championships	Antwerp, Belgium	3rd	Team competition	198 pts
1993	World Championships	Stuttgart, Germany	16th	10,000 m	30:04.34
1994	European Championships	Helsinki, Finland	6th	5000m	13:39.16
1995	World Cross Country Championships	Durham, United Kingdom	18th	Long race (12.02 km)	35:05
1995	World Cross Country Championships	Durham, United Kingdom	3rd	Team competition	120 pts

== Personal bests ==
- 5000 metres - 13:19.71 min (1993)
- 10,000 metres - 27:59.49 min (1993)
- Half marathon - 1:03:33 hrs (2001)
