= Greg van Hest =

Dutch long-distance runner

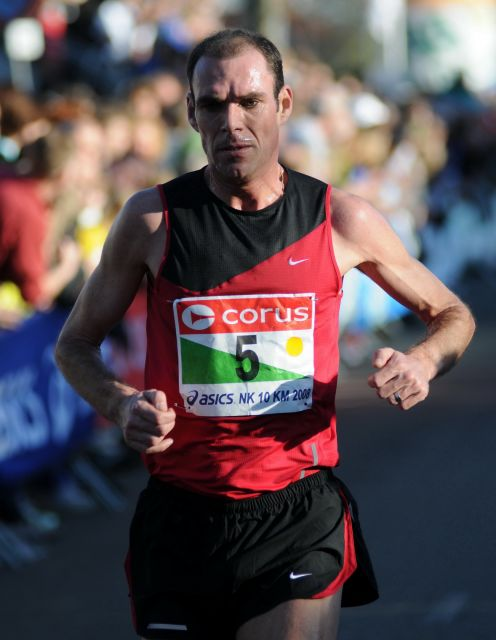
- Greg van Hest at the 2008 Dutch 10 km Championship in Schoorl

Personal information
- Full name: Greg van Hest
- Born: 3 June 1973 (age 53) Tilburg, Netherlands
- Years active: 1980-present
- Height: 1.84 m (6 ft 0 in)
- Weight: 69 kg (152 lb)

Achievements and titles
- Personal bests: 1500 metres – 3:47.8 (1993); 5000 metres – 13:38.89 (1996); 10 km – 27:51 (1995); 20 km – 58:04 (1999) half marathon – 1:01.10 (1999) marathon – 2:10.05 (1999)
- Updated on 5 May 2008

Greg van Hest (born June 3, 1973, in Tilburg) is a Dutch runner.

== Career highlights ==
Dutch National Championships
1996 - Schoorl, 1st, 10 km
1997 - Schoorl, 1st, 10 km
1999 - The Hague, 1st, Half marathon
1999 - 1st, Cross-country
2000 - The Hague, 1st, Half marathon
2008 - Eindhoven, 1st, Marathon

Other achievements
1998 - Tilburg, 4th, Tilburg 10 Miles 'my city'
1999 - Tilburg, 3rd, Tilburg 10 Miles 'my city'
2000 - Tilburg, 2nd, Tilburg 10 Miles 'my city'
2000 - Sydney, 102nd, Olympics
2011 & 2014 - Tilburg, 1st, Kruikenloop
2011 & 2014 - Oisterwijk, 1st, Vennenloop
2012 - Berkel-Enschot, 1st, Galgenloop

== Personal bests ==
Distance	Mark	Date	Location
1,500 m	3:47.80	May 25, 1993	Breda
5,000 m	13:38.89	May 17, 1996	Kerkrade
10 km	27:51	October 21, 1995	Waddinxveen
20 km	58:04	March 13, 1999	Alphen aan den Rijn
Half marathon	1:01.10	March 27, 1999	The Hague
Marathon	2:10.05	April 18, 1999	Rotterdam
Ekiden *	2:03.12 (nat. rec.)	November 23, 1994	Chiba

- * = with Simon Vroemen, Gerald Kappert, Henk Gommer and René Godlieb.
