= Sean Wade =

New Zealand long-distance runner

Sean Patrick Wade (born 2 February 1966 in Wellington) is a long-distance runner from New Zealand, who represented his native country in the men's marathon at the 1996 Summer Olympics in Atlanta, Georgia. There he finished in 83rd place. Wade was also a member of the Kiwi team at the 1990 Commonwealth Games, where he ended up in 11th position in the men's steeplechase. Now representing the United States, Wade has competed continuously since his time as an elite open athlete. In 2016, he set several age group world records in masters' athletics.

== Achievements ==
Year	Competition	Venue	Position	Notes
Representing New Zealand
1996	Olympic Games	Atlanta, United States	83rd	Marathon

In 1990, Wade was awarded the New Zealand 1990 Commemoration Medal.

== See also ==
- List of eligibility transfers in athletics
