= Rafael Zepeda =

Mexican long-distance runner

Rafael Zepeda Martínez (born August 22, 1961, in Mexico City) is a Mexican long-distance runner.

== Major competition record ==
Representing Mexico
Year	Competition	Venue	Position	Event
1987	Crescent City Classic	New Orleans, United States	12th	10 km, 28:28
1987	Bolder Boulder	Boulder, United States	12th	10 km, 30:15
1987	Prefontaine Classic	Eugene, United States	10th	10 km, 29:01.1
1987	CAC Championships	Caracas, Venezuela	1st	10,000 m, 29:46.62
1988	Crescent City Classic	New Orleans, United States	9th	10 km, 28:57
1988	Mexico City International Marathon	Mexico City, Mexico	2nd	Marathon, 2:21:19
1989	Capital Bank Orange Bowl Bay Bridge Run	Miami, United States	7th	10 km, 29:40
1989	International Bronislaw Malinowski Memorial track and field	Grudziądz, Poland	2nd	10,000 m, 28:19.8
1989	Central American and Caribbean Championships	San Juan, Puerto Rico	4th	10,000 m, 30:28
1989	Copa de las Americas	Colombia	2nd	10,000 m, 30:10
1989	IAAF World Road Relay Championships	New York City, United States	4th	
1989	RevistaCorredores	Mexico City, Mexico	3rd	15 km, 45:38
1990	New York City Marathon	New York City, United States	11th	Marathon, 2:17:01
1990	Florida Citrus Bowl Half Marathon	Orlando, United States	2nd	Half marathon, 1:02:49
1991	City of Los Angeles Marathon	Los Angeles, United States	6th	Marathon, 2:15:51
1991	BankersTrust Drake Relays Road Race	Des Moines, United States	1st	10 km, 28:15
1991	Citrus Bowl	Orlando, United States	5th	Half marathon, 1:05:17
1992	IAAF World Road Relay Championships	Berlin, Germany	6th	
1993	Mexico City Marathon	Mexico City, Mexico	10th	Marathon, 2:21:01
1994	Walt Disney World Marathon	Orlando, United States	13th	Marathon, 2:21:35
1995	Philadelphia Distance Run	Philadelphia, United States	13th	Half marathon, 1:03:47
1995	Twin Cities Marathon	Minneapolis, United States	1st	Marathon, 2:15:09
