= Marzia Gazzetta =

Italian middle-distance runner (born 1967)

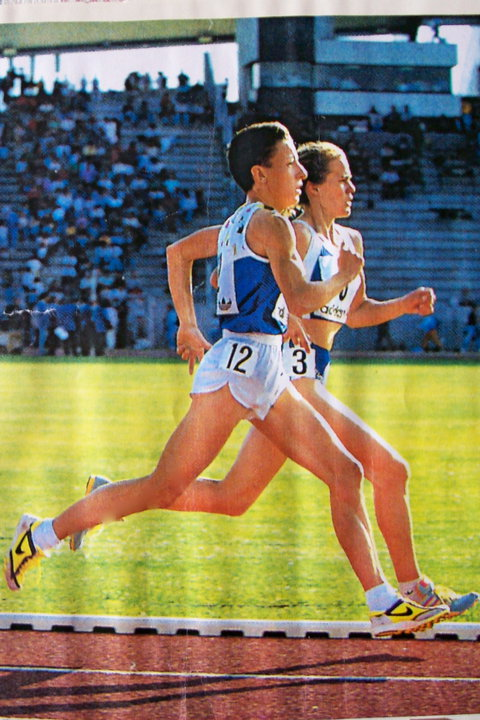
- Marzia Gazzetta (with number 12)

Personal information
- Nationality: Italian
- Born: August 31, 1967 (age 58) Monselice, Italy

Sport
- Country: Italy
- Sport: Athletics
- Event: Middle distance
- Club: Chimica Monselice; Snam Gas Metano

Achievements and titles
- Personal bests: 1500 m: 4:13.48 (1990); 3000 m: 9:06.49 (1994)

Marzia Gazzetta (Monselice, 31 August 1967) is an Italian former Middle distance runner.

== Biography ==
In her career she won one time national championships on 1500 metres indoor (1991). She has 15 caps in national team.

== National titles ==
- 1 win in 1500 metres at the Italian Athletics Indoor Championships (1991)
