= Antonio Martins Bordelo =

French long-distance runner

Personal information
- Other names: Antonio Martins; Tony Martins-Bordelo
- Born: 23 August 1963 (age 62) Vimioso, Portugal
- Height: 169 cm (5 ft 7 in)
- Weight: 58 kg (128 lb)

Sport
- Country: France
- Sport: Long-distance running
- Event: 3000 metres – Marathon
Medal record
Men's athletics
Representing France
Mediterranean Games
Bronze medal – third place	1991 Athens	5000 m

Antonio 'Tony' Martins Bordelo (born 23 August 1963) is a French former professional long-distance runner. He competed in the men's 10,000 metres at the 1992 Summer Olympics.

He held the France national record in the 10,000 metres for 27 years from July 1992 to July 2019, as well as the 5,000 metres record for 3 years between July 1992 and June 1995. He also won the Marseille-Cassis Classique Internationale three times

== Personal bests ==
Outdoor

- 3000 metres – 7:47.22 (Villeneuve d'Ascq 1991)
- 5000 metres – 13:14.47 (Monaco 1992)
- 10,000 metres – 27:22.78 (Oslo 1992)

Road

- 10K – 29:25 (Marseille 2001)
- Half marathon – 1:03:04 (Auray 1999)
- Marathon – 2:13:32 (Monaco 1999)
