= Simon Karori =

Kenyan long-distance runner

Simon K. Arori (born 28 August 1959) is a Kenyan long-distance runner.

At the 1991 World Cross Country Championships, he won a silver medal in the long race. This was enough to allow Kenya to win a gold medal in the team competition.
