= Liu Jianying =

Chinese long-distance runner

Liu Jianying (born 17 October 1970) is a Chinese female former long-distance runner who competed over distances from 1500 metres up to the half marathon. She represented her country at the 1997 World Championships in Athletics, placing sixth in the 5000 metres. She competed for Asia at the 1994 IAAF World Cup, finishing fourth in the 3000 metres. He greatest individual success was a gold medal in the 1500 m at the 1997 East Asian Games.

Liu was a frequent member of China's team for international ekiden races, including the 1998 IAAF World Road Relay Championships, Yokohama International Women's Ekiden (1992, 1993, 1994, 1997, 1998), International Chiba Ekiden (1996, 1997), and 1992 Beijing International Women's Ekiden. She was the 1997 winner of the Sendai Half Marathon with a career best of 73:15 minutes. She was a finalist at the National Games of China over 10,000 metres in 1993 and 5000 m in 1997.

== International competitions ==
Year	Competition	Venue	Position	Event	Notes
1994	IAAF World Cup	London, United Kingdom	4th	3000 m	9:15.39
1997	East Asian Games	Busan, South Korea	1st	1500 m	4:19.36
1997	World Championships	Athens, Greece	6th	5000 m	15:10.64
1998	Goodwill Games	Uniondale, United States	10th	5000 m	17:02.41
1998	IAAF World Road Relay Championships	Manaus, Brazil	8th	Leg 1	16:49
