= Harumi Hiroyama =

Japanese long-distance runner

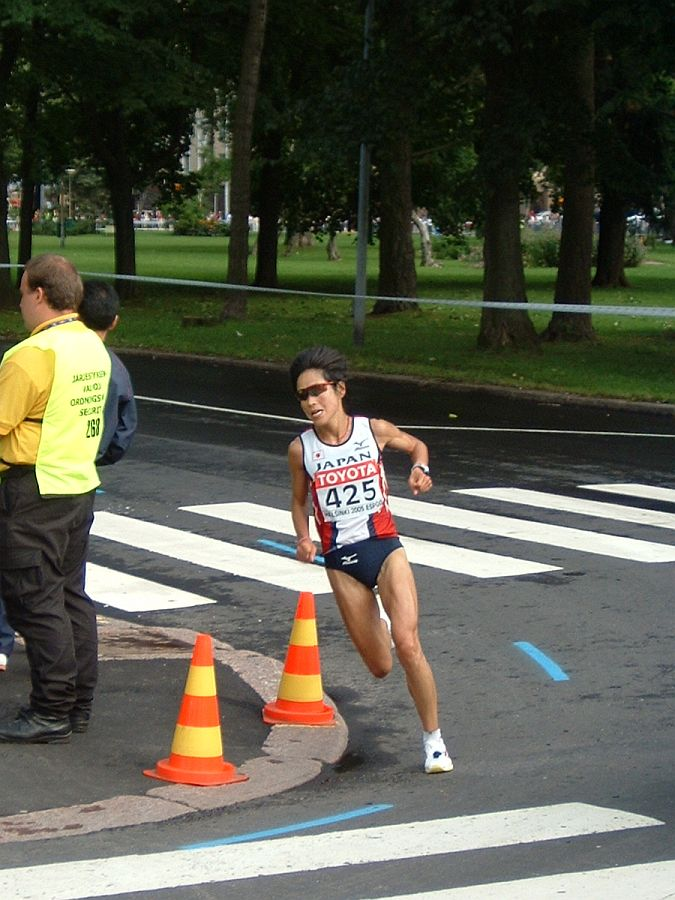
Harumi Hiroyama

Harumi Hiroyama (Japanese: 弘山晴美; born 2 September 1968 in Naruto, Tokushima) is a Japanese long-distance runner. In her early career she specialized in the 1500 and 3000 metres, but gradually she shifted to the 5000 metres, 10,000 metres and the marathon race.

She won her first marathon in 2006 at the age of 37 when she beat Yoko Shibui to the finish to win the Nagoya International Women's Marathon.

== Achievements ==
Year	Competition	Venue	Position	Event	Notes
Representing Japan
1994	Asian Games	Hiroshima, Japan	2nd	3000 m	
1997	World Championships	Athens, Greece	8th	5000 m	
1997	East Asian Games	Busan, South Korea	1st	5000 m	
1999	World Championships	Seville, Spain	4th	10,000 m	
2000	Osaka Ladies Marathon	Osaka, Japan	2nd	Marathon	2:22:56
2001	London Marathon	London, United Kingdom	12th	Marathon	2:29:01
2002	Asian Games	Busan, South Korea	2nd	Marathon	2:34:44
2005	World Championships	Helsinki, Finland	8th	Marathon	2:25:46
2006	Nagoya Marathon	Nagoya, Japan	1st	Marathon	2:23:26

== Personal bests ==
- 1500 metres - 4:11.10 min (1994)
- 3000 metres - 8:50.40 min (1994)
- 5000 metres - 15:03.67 min (1998)
- 10,000 metres - 31:22.72 min (1997)
- Marathon - 2:22:56 hrs (2000)
