= Ajay Chuttoo =

Mauritian long-distance runner

Personal information
- Nationality: Mauritian
- Born: 13 November 1965 (age 60)

Sport
- Sport: Long-distance running
- Event: Marathon

Ajay Chuttoo (born 13 November 1965) is a Mauritian long-distance runner. He competed in the men's marathon at the 1996 Summer Olympics.
