= Florina Pană =

Romanian long-distance runner

Florina Pană (born January 20, 1973, in Bucharest) is a retired female long-distance runner from Romania. She set her personal best (2:30:23) in the women's marathon on April 18, 1999, in Bordeaux, France.

== Achievements ==
Year	Competition	Venue	Position	Event	Notes
Representing Romania
1999	Vienna City Marathon	Vienna, Austria	1st	Marathon	2:34:26
1999	World Championships	Seville, Spain	13th	Marathon	2:30:28
