= Natsue Koikawa =

Personal information
- Nationality: Japanese
- Born: February 2, 1972 (age 54)

Sport
- Sport: Athletics
- Event: Running

Natsue Koikawa (鯉川 なつえ, Koikawa Natsue) is a former Japanese track athlete and current university professor and coach at Juntendo University in Chiba, Japan.

== Athletics ==
Koikawa competed for Japan in the 1990 IAAF World Cross Country Championships in Aix-les-Bains, finishing 14th with a time of 14:39, in the 1991 IAAF World Cross Country Championships in Antwerp, finishing 19th with a time of 14:56 and in the 10,000 metres at the 1993 Summer Universiade in Buffalo, NY, on July 15, 1993 finishing with a time of 33:01.81.

== Educational and Coaching Career ==
Koikawa is an Associate Professor of Sports Science at Juntendo University in Tokyo, Japan, Director of Women’s Track and Field at the university, and the Deputy Directory of Japanese Center for Research on Women in Sport. She is interested in the dynamics involving female athletic competitors and coaching these individuals. She has published studies focusing on the differing needs of female athletes from their male counterparts.

At the university, Koikawa does fundraising to support the athletics department, while also teaching, doing research and coaching. The money she raises goes towards training camps held three times a year. Because the athletes receive little support from the university, she asks for funds from supplement makers and food manufacturers. She also recruits athletes, finding that she gets less respect than her male counterparts. As of 2016, Koikawa is the only female head coach at the university level in Japan.
