= Melody Fairchild =

American long-distance runner

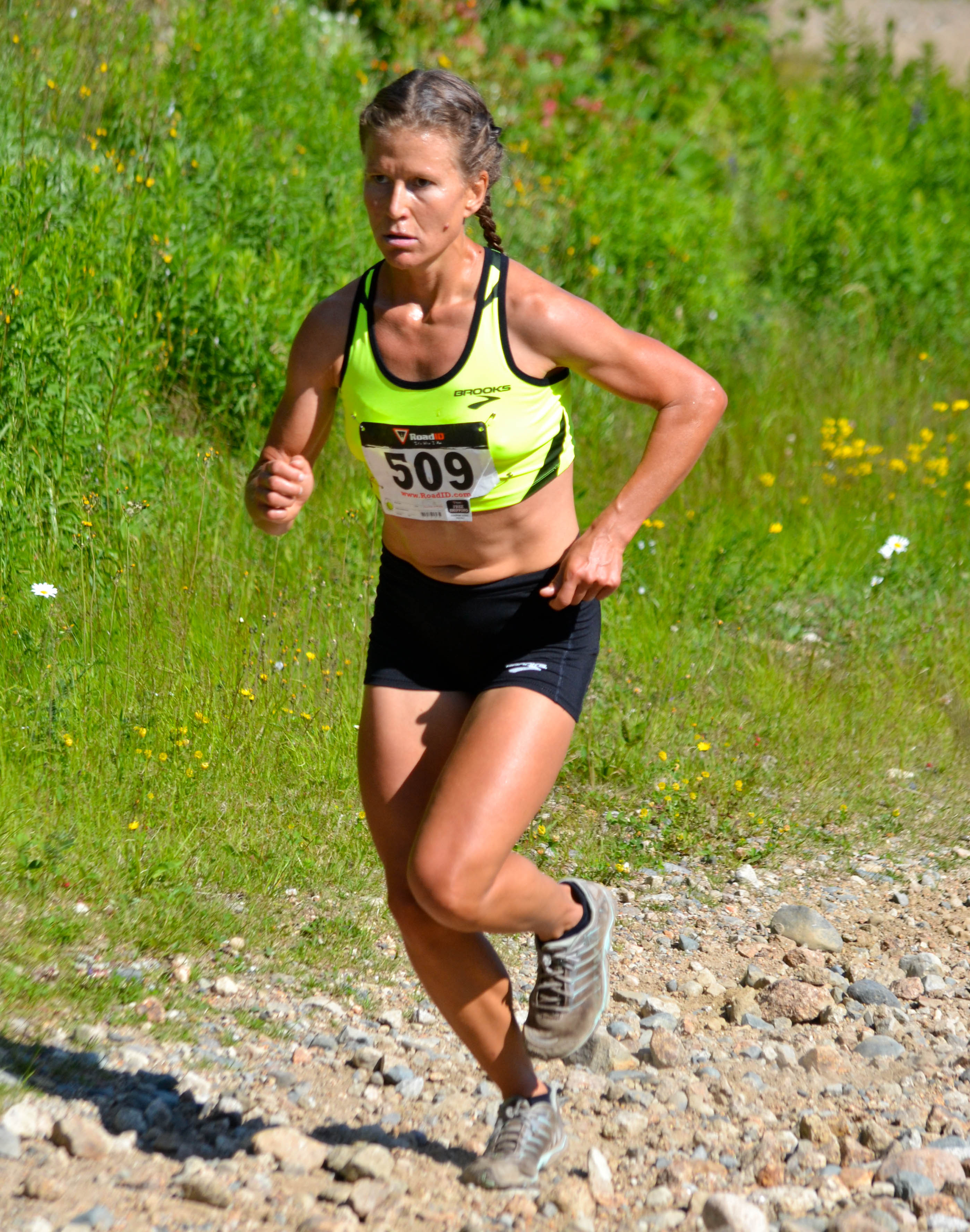

Personal information
- Full name: Melody Fairchild
- Nationality: American
- Born: 10 September 1973 (age 52)
Medal record
Representing the United States
Women's athletics
World Junior Cross Country Championships
Bronze medal – third place	1991 Antwerp	Women's race

Melody Fairchild (born as the twin to Germaine on September 10, 1973 in Boulder, Colorado) is an American long distance runner. She is primarily known for an exceptional high school career. She has been called the "Best American High School distance runner of all time." In 1991, she set the American Junior and National High School record in the indoor 3,000 meters.

As a child she took up running on her own volition. By age 10 she was running a hilly 5 mile run daily, timing herself to make herself faster each day. By age 15 she was a high school phenom. She won her hometown Bolder Boulder three consecutive times. Between Cross Country and Track, she won eight state titles and became only the second person to defend their title at the Foot Locker Cross Country Championships, then called the Kinney Cross Country Championships, winning in 1989 and 1990. Her 1990 winning time of 16:39, reputed to be by a quarter of a mile, is the still standing Morley Field course record. She is the first female scholastic athlete to run two miles in less than 10 minutes (9:55.9). a record she held for 22 years. While still in high school, she finished third in the 1991 World Junior Cross Country Championships behind a couple of Kenyan runners (the winner only 13 years old).

By the time she reached the University of Oregon on a track scholarship, injuries and an eating disorder prevented her from running for her first two years. She gave up her scholarship her junior year, only to return to earn it back as a senior, placing ninth in the 1995 NCAA Women's Division I Cross Country Championship and winning the 1996 3000 meters at the NCAA Division I Indoor Track and Field Championships. Inducted in the 2017 Oregon Ducks athletics hall of fame.

In 2000, she made a failed attempt to make the U. S. Olympic team in the marathon, then disappeared from the scene. At age 37, she decided to give it one more go, training for the 2012 Olympic Trials. While failing to reach that lofty goal, she did finish 8th at the 2012 World Mountain Running Championships and winning the 2010 women's division of the Transrockies Run - the running version of the Transrockies race.
