= Desta Asgedom =

Ethiopian middle-distance runner

Personal information
- Nationality: Ethiopian
- Born: Desta Asgedom; 29 February 1972 Maychew, Tigray, Ethiopia
- Died: 1 September 1992 (aged 20) Pico Rivera, California, U.S.
- Height: 1.83 m (6 ft 0 in)
- Weight: 61.2 kg (135 lb)
- Parents: Asgedom Gebrehiwot (father); Tsihre Hailu (mother)

Sport
- Country: Ethiopia
- Sport: Middle-distance running
- Event: 800 metres / 1500 metres
Medal record
Men's athletics
Representing Ethiopia
All-Africa Games
Silver medal – second place	1991 Cairo	1500 m
African Championships
Bronze medal – third place	1990 Cairo	800 m

Desta Asgedom (29 February 1972 – 1 September 1992) was an Ethiopian athlete who specialised in middle distance races. A world junior 800 metres champion and an All-Africa Games silver medalist, he died in the United States not long after these achievements.

== Biography ==
Asgedom first came to prominence in 1990 with his performances at the World Junior Championships in Bulgaria, where he won a gold medal in the 800 metres and claimed a bronze medal in the 1500 metres race. In the same year he was a bronze medalist in the 800 metres at the African Championships in Cairo.

In 1991 he competed in the World Championships, which were held in Tokyo. Soon after he represented Ethiopia at the 1991 All-Africa Games and finished with the silver medal in the 1500 metres.

He came to the United States early in 1992 to attend California's Riverside Community College. In August he got an offer of a scholarship to Wayland Baptist in Texas and spent a week on campus before deciding to decline, due to the lack of a large Ethiopian community, like there was at Riverside.

=== Death ===
Asgedom was killed when on 1 September 1992 he was struck by a pickup truck driver while out running on Washington Boulevard in Pico Rivera, California. He died from his injuries at Whittier Presbyterian Hospital, 25 minutes after being hit. His death was ruled a suicide by the L.A. County Sheriff's Department. The verdict from the Sheriff's Department was based on the results of an autopsy and witnesses accounts. The truck driver said that Asgedom had been standing facing traffic waiting to cross and made eye contact before he dove in front of the incoming vehicle. Two other witnesses corroborated the claim that Asgedom had jumped in front of the truck.

His coach, Ted Banks, described Asgedom as a "tremendous runner" who with some more experience "had the potential to be an Olympic medal winner".
