= Chala Kelele =

Ethiopian long-distance runner

Chala Kelele Tekelli (born 7 October 1966) is a retired Ethiopian runner who specialized in cross-country running. He represented Ethiopia at six editions of the IAAF World Cross Country Championships, as well as the 1994 IAAF World Half Marathon Championships and in the IAAF World Road Relay Championships.

== International competitions ==
Year	Competition	Venue	Position	Notes
1988	World Cross Country Championships	Auckland, New Zealand	2nd	Team competition
1991	World Cross Country Championships	Antwerp, Belgium	7th	Long race
1991	World Cross Country Championships	Antwerp, Belgium	2nd	Team competition
1995	World Cross Country Championships	Durham, United Kingdom	27th	Long race
1995	World Cross Country Championships	Durham, United Kingdom	5th	Team competition
1996	World Cross Country Championships	Stellenbosch, South Africa	3rd	Team competition
