= Abraham Assefa =

Ethiopian long-distance runner

Personal information
- Nationality: Ethiopian
- Born: 9 December 1972 (age 53)

Sport
- Sport: Long-distance running
- Event: 10,000 metres

Abraham Assefa (born 9 December 1972) is an Ethiopian long-distance runner. He competed in the men's 10,000 metres at the 1996 Summer Olympics.
