= North Korea at the 2016 Summer Olympics =

- IOC code: PRK
- NOC: Olympic Committee of the Democratic People's Republic of Korea

in Rio de Janeiro
- Competitors: 35 in 9 sports
- Flag bearers: Choe Jon-wi (opening); Yun Won-chol (closing)
- Medals Ranked 34th: Gold 2 Silver 3 Bronze 2 Total 7

Summer Olympics appearances (overview)
- 1972; 1976; 1980; 1984–1988; 1992; 1996; 2000; 2004; 2008; 2012; 2016; 2020; 2024; 2028

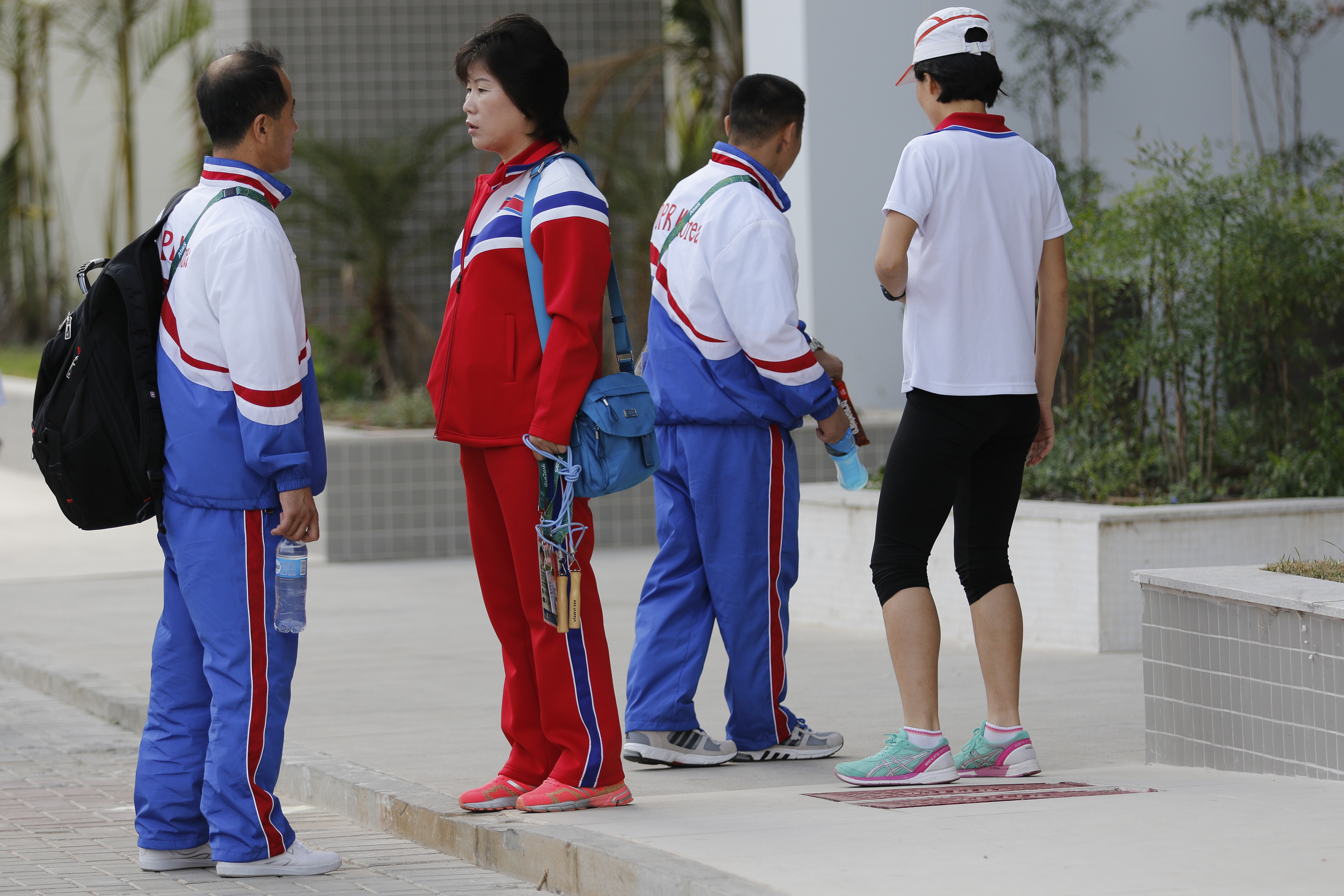
North Korean representatives at the Rio 2016 Olympic Village

North Korea, officially the Democratic People's Republic of Korea, competed at the 2016 Summer Olympics in Rio de Janeiro, Brazil, from 5 to 21 August 2016. This was the nation's tenth appearance at the Summer Olympics.

The Olympic Committee of the Democratic People's Republic of Korea sent the nation's smallest delegation to the Games since 2000. A total of 35 athletes, 15 men and 20 women, were selected for the North Korean team across nine different sports, marking the fourth straight Games to feature more female athletes than male. North Korea did not register any of its entrants in boxing for the first time since 1972, but was represented in artistic gymnastics for the first time in eight years, after missing out of London 2012 due to a two-year suspension for age falsification.

Notable athletes on the North Korean roster included weightlifting champions Om Yun-chol (men's 56 kg) and Rim Jong-sim (women's 75 kg), twins Kim Hye-gyong and Kim Hye-song in the women's marathon, pistol shooter and three-time Olympian Kim Jong-su, and former gymnastics champion Hong Un-jong in the women's vault. Weightlifting rookie Choe Jon-wi was selected by the committee to lead the North Korean delegation as the flag bearer in the opening ceremony.

North Korea left Rio de Janeiro with a total of seven medals (2 golds, 3 silver, and 2 bronze), signifying its most successful Olympic outcome based on the overall medal count, but falling short of the 12-medal target set by its sports commission. Half of North Korea's medal haul was distributed to the weightlifters, while the rest to the competitors in artistic gymnastics, shooting, and table tennis. Among the medalists were Rim Jong-sim, who repeated her golden feat from London four years earlier in a heavier category, and double world champion Ri Se-gwang, who obtained the nation's first ever gymnastics title by a male after 24 years.

== Medalists ==
Medal	Name	Sport	Event	Date
Gold	Rim Jong-sim	Weightlifting	Women's 75 kg	12 August
Gold	Ri Se-gwang	Gymnastics	Men's vault	15 August
Silver	Om Yun-chol	Weightlifting	Men's 56 kg	7 August
Silver	Choe Hyo-sim	Weightlifting	Women's 63 kg	9 August
Silver	Kim Kuk-hyang	Weightlifting	Women's +75 kg	14 August
Bronze	Kim Song-guk	Shooting	Men's 50 m pistol	10 August
Bronze	Kim Song-i	Table tennis	Women's singles	10 August

== Archery ==
One North Korean archer qualified for the women's individual recurve by obtaining one of the three Olympic places available from the 2015 Asian Archery Championships in Bangkok, Thailand.

Athlete	Event	Ranking round		Round of 64	Round of 32	Round of 16	Quarterfinals	Semifinals	Final / BM	
Athlete	Event	Score	Seed	Opposition Score	Opposition Score	Opposition Score	Opposition Score	Opposition Score	Opposition Score	Rank
Kang Un-ju	Women's individual	643	15	Nikitin (BRA); W 6–0	Bjerendal (SWE); W 6–2	Chang H-j (KOR); L 2–6	Did not advance			

== Athletics (track and field) ==
North Korean athletes achieved qualifying standards in the following athletics events (up to a maximum of three athletes in each event):

Key

- Note–Ranks given for track events are within the athlete's heat only
- Q = Qualified for the next round
- q = Qualified for the next round as a fastest loser or, in field events, by position without achieving the qualifying target
- NR = National record
- N/A = Round not applicable for the event
- Bye = Athlete not required to compete in round

Track & road events

Athlete	Event	Final	
Athlete	Event	Result	Rank
Pak Chol	Men's marathon	2:15:27	27
Kim Hye-gyong	Women's marathon	2:28:36	11
Kim Hye-song	Women's marathon	2:28:36	10
Kim Kum-ok	Women's marathon	2:38:24	49

== Diving ==
North Korean divers qualified for the following individual spots and synchronized teams at the 2016 Olympic Games by achieving a top-three finish at the 2015 World Championships.

Athlete	Event	Preliminaries		Semifinals		Final	
Athlete	Event	Points	Rank	Points	Rank	Points	Rank
Kim Kuk-hyang	Women's 10 m platform	263.20	25	Did not advance			
Kim Un-hyang	Women's 10 m platform	289.45	18 Q	343.70	5 Q	357.90	7
Kim Kuk-hyang; Kim Mi-rae	Women's 10 m synchronized platform	—N/a				322.44	4

== Gymnastics ==
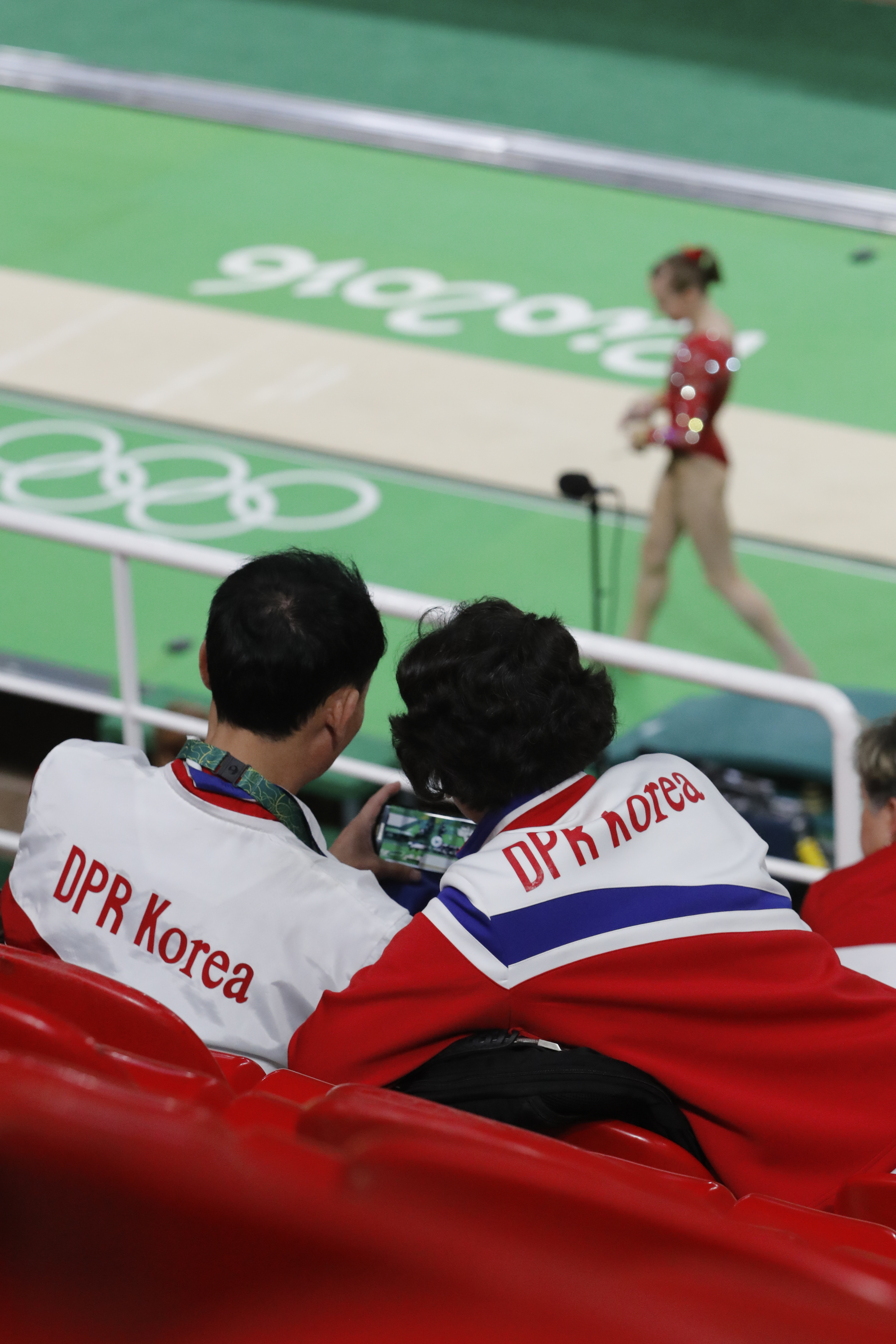
North Koreans observe women's artistic gymnastics training in Rio.

=== Artistic ===
North Korea has qualified one male and one female artistic gymnast for of the following apparatus and all-around events through the 2015 World Championships.

Men

Athlete	Event	Qualification								Final							
Athlete	Event	Apparatus						Total	Rank	Apparatus						Total	Rank
Athlete	Event	F	PH	R	V	PB	HB	Total	Rank	F	PH	R	V	PB	HB	Total	Rank
Ri Se-gwang	Vault	—N/a			15.433	—N/a		15.433	1 Q	—N/a			15.691	—N/a		15.691	1st place, gold medalist(s)

Women

Athlete	Event	Qualification						Final					
Athlete	Event	Apparatus				Total	Rank	Apparatus				Total	Rank
Athlete	Event	V	UB	BB	F	Total	Rank	V	UB	BB	F	Total	Rank
Hong Un-jong	Vault	15.683	—N/a			15.683	2 Q	14.900	—N/a			14.900	6
Hong Un-jong	Floor	—N/a			12.533	12.533	71	Did not advance					

== Judo ==
North Korea qualified three judokas for each of the following weight classes at the Games. Hong Kuk-hyon and Kyong Sol were ranked among the top 22 eligible judokas for men and top 14 for women in the IJF World Ranking List of 30 May 2016, while Kim Sol-mi in the women's extra-lightweight (48 kg) earned a continental quota spot from the Asian region as the highest-ranked North Korean judoka outside of direct qualifying position.

Athlete	Event	Round of 64	Round of 32	Round of 16	Quarterfinals	Semifinals	Repechage	Final / BM	
Athlete	Event	Opposition Result	Opposition Result	Opposition Result	Opposition Result	Opposition Result	Opposition Result	Opposition Result	Rank
Hong Kuk-hyon	Men's −73 kg	Duprat (FRA); L 000–100	Did not advance						
Kim Sol-mi	Women's −48 kg	—N/a	Dolgova (RUS); L 000–001	Did not advance					
Sol Kyong	Women's −78 kg	—N/a	Bye	Tcheuméo (FRA); L 000–100	Did not advance				

== Shooting ==
North Korean shooters have achieved quota places for the following events by virtue of their best finishes at the 2014 and 2015 ISSF World Championships, the 2015 ISSF World Cup series, and Asian Championships, as long as they obtained a minimum qualifying score (MQS) as of March 31, 2016.

Athlete	Event	Qualification		Semifinal		Final	
Athlete	Event	Points	Rank	Points	Rank	Points	Rank
Kim Jong-su	Men's 10 m air pistol	575	27	—N/a		Did not advance	
Kim Jong-su	Men's 50 m pistol	548	24	—N/a		Did not advance	
Kim Song-guk	Men's 10 m air pistol	577	17	—N/a		Did not advance	
Kim Song-guk	Men's 50 m pistol	557	5 Q	—N/a		172.8	3rd place, bronze medalist(s)
Jo Yong-suk	Women's 10 m air pistol	381	12	—N/a		Did not advance	
Jo Yong-suk	Women's 25 m pistol	582	6 Q	12	7	Did not advance	
Pak Yong-hui	Women's trap	65	12	Did not advance			

Qualification Legend: Q = Qualify for the next round; q = Qualify for the bronze medal (shotgun)

== Table tennis ==
North Korea has fielded a team of three athletes into the table tennis competition at the Games. Kim Song I and 2012 Olympian Ri Myong-sun scored a second-stage draw victory each to book two of six remaining Olympic spots in the women's singles at the Asian Qualification Tournament in Hong Kong.

Ri Mi-gyong was awarded the third spot to build the women's team for the Games by virtue of a top 10 national finish in the ITTF Olympic Rankings.

Athlete	Event	Preliminary	Round 1	Round 2	Round 3	Round of 16	Quarterfinals	Semifinals	Final / BM	
Athlete	Event	Opposition Result	Opposition Result	Opposition Result	Opposition Result	Opposition Result	Opposition Result	Opposition Result	Opposition Result	Rank
Kim Song-i	Women's singles	Bye		Grzybowska (POL); W 4–0	Ishikawa (JPN); W 4–3	Chen S-y (TPE); W 4–2	Yu My (SIN); W 4–2	Ding N (CHN); L 1–4	Fukuhara (JPN); W 4–1	3rd place, bronze medalist(s)
Ri Myong-sun	Women's singles	Bye		Lovas (HUN); W 4–1	Solja (GER); W 4–0	Fukuhara (JPN); L 0–4	Did not advance			
Kim Song-i; Ri Mi-gyong; Ri Myong-sun	Women's team	—N/a				Australia; W 3–0	China; L 0–3	did not advance		

== Weightlifting ==
North Korean weightlifters have qualified a maximum of six men's and four women's quota places for the Rio Olympics based on their combined team standing by points at the 2014 and 2015 IWF World Championships. The team must allocate these places to individual athletes by 20 June 2016.

On 22 June 2016, the International Weightlifting Federation decided to strip one men's and one women's entry place each from North Korea to the Olympics because of "multiple positive cases" of doping throughout the qualifying period.

Men

Athlete	Event	Snatch		Clean & jerk		Total	Rank
Athlete	Event	Result	Rank	Result	Rank	Total	Rank
Om Yun-chol	−56 kg	134	2	169	2	303	2nd place, silver medalist(s)
Kim Myong-hyok	−69 kg	157	3	~~196~~	DNF	-	DNF
Kwon Yong-gwang	−69 kg	137	16	176	11	313	14
Choe Jon-wi	−77 kg	153	8	190	8	343	8

Women

Athlete	Event	Snatch		Clean & jerk		Total	Rank
Athlete	Event	Result	Rank	Result	Rank	Total	Rank
Choe Hyo-sim	−63 kg	105	3	143	2	248	2nd place, silver medalist(s)
Rim Jong-sim	−75 kg	121	1	153	1	274	1st place, gold medalist(s)
Kim Kuk-hyang	+75 kg	131	1	175	2	306	2nd place, silver medalist(s)

== Wrestling ==
North Korea has qualified a total of four wrestlers for each of the following weight classes into the Olympic competition. Three of them finished among the top six to book an Olympic spot each in the men's freestyle 57 kg, men's Greco-Roman 59 kg, and women's freestyle 53 kg at the 2015 World Championships, while the other had claimed the remaining Olympic slot to round out the North Korean roster at the initial meet of the World Qualification Tournament in Ulaanbaatar.

Key:

- VT – Victory by Fall.
- PP – Decision by Points – the loser with technical points.
- PO – Decision by Points – the loser without technical points.
- ST – Technical superiority – the loser without technical points and a margin of victory of at least 8 (Greco-Roman) or 10 (freestyle) points.

Men's freestyle

Athlete	Event	Qualification	Round of 16	Quarterfinal	Semifinal	Repechage 1	Repechage 2	Final / BM	
Athlete	Event	Opposition Result	Opposition Result	Opposition Result	Opposition Result	Opposition Result	Opposition Result	Opposition Result	Rank
Yang Kyong-il	−57 kg	Higuchi (JPN); L 1–4 ^{SP}	Did not advance			Lachinau (BLR); W 3–1 ^{PP}	Bonne (CUB); L 1–4 ^{SP}	Did not advance	8

Men's Greco-Roman

Athlete	Event	Qualification	Round of 16	Quarterfinal	Semifinal	Repechage 1	Repechage 2	Final / BM	
Athlete	Event	Opposition Result	Opposition Result	Opposition Result	Opposition Result	Opposition Result	Opposition Result	Opposition Result	Rank
Yun Won-chol	−59 kg	Bye	Mahmoud (EGY); W 3–1 ^{PP}	Tasmuradov (UZB); L 0–4 ^{ST}	Did not advance				10

Women's freestyle

Athlete	Event	Qualification	Round of 16	Quarterfinal	Semifinal	Repechage 1	Repechage 2	Final / BM	
Athlete	Event	Opposition Result	Opposition Result	Opposition Result	Opposition Result	Opposition Result	Opposition Result	Opposition Result	Rank
Kim Hyon-gyong	−48 kg	Dadasheva (RUS); L 1–3 ^{PP}	Did not advance						13
Jong Myong-suk	−53 kg	Gallays (CAN); W 4–0 ^{ST}	Gün (TUR); W 4–0 ^{ST}	Maroulis (USA); L 1–3 ^{PP}	Did not advance	Bye	Zhong Xc (CHN); L 1–3 ^{PP}	Did not advance	7
