= 1989 in the sport of athletics =

1989 in athletics
- Major world events: World Indoor Championships

This article contains an overview of the year 1989 in athletics.

== International Events ==
- African Championships
- Asian Championships
- Balkan Games
- Central American and Caribbean Championships
- Bolivarian Games
- European Indoor Championships
- Jeux de la Francophonie
- South American Championships
- World Cross Country Championships
- World Indoor Championships
- World Student Games

== World records ==
=== Men ===
| EVENT | ATHLETE | MARK | DATE | VENUE |
|---|---|---|---|---|
| 3,000 metres | Said Aouita (MAR) | 7:29.45 | 20 August | Köln, West Germany |
| 10,000 metres | Arturo Barrios (MEX) | 27:08.23 | 18 August | Berlin, West Germany |
| 110 m hurdles | Roger Kingdom (USA) | 12.92 | 16 August | Zürich, Switzerland |
| 3,000 m steeplechase | Peter Koech (KEN) | 8:05.35 | 3 July | Stockholm, Sweden |
| 4 × 200 metres relay | Santa Monica TC United States • Danny Everett • Leroy Burrell • Floyd Heard • Carl Lewis | 1:19.38 | 23 August | Koblenz, West Germany |
| High Jump | Javier Sotomayor (CUB) | 2.44m | 29 July | San Juan, Puerto Rico |

=== Women ===
| EVENT | ATHLETE | MARK | DATE | VENUE |
|---|---|---|---|---|
| Mile | Paula Ivan (ROU) | 4:15.61 | 10 July | Nice, France |
| Half Marathon | Ingrid Kristiansen (NOR) | 1:08:31 | 16 September | New Bedford, United States |

== Men's Best Year Performers ==
=== 100 metres ===
| RANK | 1989 WORLD BEST PERFORMERS | TIME |
|---|---|---|
| 1. | Leroy Burrell (USA) | 9.94 |
| 2. | Raymond Stewart (JAM) | 9.97 |
| 3. | Frank Fredericks (RSA) | 10.02 |
| 4. | Dennis Mitchell (USA) | 10.03 |
| 5. | Andre Cason (USA) | 10.04 |

=== 200 metres ===
| RANK | 1989 WORLD BEST PERFORMERS | TIME |
|---|---|---|
| 1. | Robson da Silva (BRA) | 19.96 |
| 2. | Dennis Mitchell (USA) | 20.09 |
| 2. | Floyd Heard (USA) | 20.09 |
| 4. | Mark Witherspoon (USA) | 20.12 |
| 5. | Joe DeLoach (USA) | 20.13 |

=== 400 metres ===
| RANK | 1989 WORLD BEST PERFORMERS | TIME |
|---|---|---|
| 1. | Antonio Pettigrew (USA) | 44.27 |
| 2. | Butch Reynolds (USA) | 44.30 |
| 3. | Danny Everett (USA) | 44.36 |
| 4. | Steve Lewis (USA) | 44.47 |
| 5. | Roberto Hernández (CUB) | 44.58 |

=== 800 metres ===
| RANK | 1989 WORLD BEST PERFORMERS | TIME |
|---|---|---|
| 1. | Paul Ereng (KEN) | 1:43.16 |
| 2. | Nixon Kiprotich (KEN) | 1:43.38 |
| — | Sebastian Coe (GBR) | 1:43.38 |
| 4. | Johnny Gray (USA) | 1:43.39 |
| 5. | Abdi Bile (SOM) | 1:43.60 |

=== 1,500 metres ===
| RANK | 1989 WORLD BEST PERFORMERS | TIME |
|---|---|---|
| 1. | Abdi Bile (SOM) | 3:30.55 |
| 2. | Saïd Aouita (MAR) | 3:30.63 |
| 3. | Wilfred Kirochi (KEN) | 3:32.57 |
| 4. | Gennaro di Napoli (ITA) | 3:32.98 |
| 5. | José Luis González (ESP) | 3:33.33 |

=== Mile ===
| RANK | 1989 WORLD BEST PERFORMERS | TIME |
|---|---|---|
| 1. | Abdi Bile (SOM) | 3:49.90 |
| 2. | Saïd Aouita (MAR) | 3:50.09 |
| 3. | Wilfred Kirochi (KEN) | 3:50.49 |
| 4. | Joe Falcon (USA) | 3:51.07 |
| 5. | Dieter Baumann (FRG) | 3:51.15 |

=== 3,000 metres ===
| RANK | 1989 WORLD BEST PERFORMERS | TIME |
|---|---|---|
| 1. | Saïd Aouita (MAR) | 7:29.45 |
| 2. | Yobes Ondieki (KEN) | 7:35.01 |
| 3. | Arturo Barrios (MEX) | 7:35.71 |
| 4. | Dieter Baumann (FRG) | 7:38.93 |
| 5. | Vincent Rousseau (BEL) | 7:39.41 |

=== 5,000 metres ===
| RANK | 1989 WORLD BEST PERFORMERS | TIME |
|---|---|---|
| 1. | Yobes Ondieki (KEN) | 13:04.24 |
| 2. | Saïd Aouita (MAR) | 13:06.26 |
| 3. | Arturo Barrios (MEX) | 13:07.79 |
| 4. | Brahim Boutayeb (MAR) | 13:12.10 |
| 5. | Sydney Maree (USA) | 13:13.84 |

=== 10,000 metres ===
| RANK | 1989 WORLD BEST PERFORMERS | TIME |
|---|---|---|
| 1. | Arturo Barrios (MEX) | 27:08.23 |
| 2. | Salvatore Antibo (ITA) | 27:16.50 |
| 3. | Addis Abebe (ETH) | 27:17.82 |
| 4. | Francesco Panetta (ITA) | 27:24.16 |
| 5. | John Ngugi (KEN) | 27:28.07 |

=== Half Marathon ===
| RANK | 1989 WORLD BEST PERFORMERS | TIME |
|---|---|---|
| 1. | Matthew Temane (RSA) | 1:01:10 |

=== Marathon ===
| RANK | 1989 WORLD BEST PERFORMERS | TIME |
|---|---|---|
| 1. | Juma Ikangaa (TAN) | 2:08:01 |
| 2. | Belayneh Dinsamo (ETH) | 2:08:40 |
| 3. | Douglas Wakiihuri (KEN) | 2:09:03 |
| 4. | Abebe Mekonnen (ETH) | 2:09:06 |
| — | Steve Moneghetti (AUS) | 2:09:06 |

=== 110m Hurdles ===
| RANK | 1989 WORLD BEST PERFORMERS | TIME |
|---|---|---|
| 1. | Roger Kingdom (USA) | 12.92 |
| 2. | Colin Jackson (GBR) | 13.11 |
| 3. | Greg Foster (USA) | 13.19 |
| 4. | Renaldo Nehemiah (USA) | 13.20 |
| 5. | Tonie Campbell (USA) | 13.22 |

=== 400m Hurdles ===
| RANK | 1989 WORLD BEST PERFORMERS | TIME |
|---|---|---|
| 1. | Kevin Young (USA) | 47.86 |
| 2. | Andre Phillips (USA) | 47.94 |
| 3. | Winthrop Graham (JAM) | 48.20 |
| 4. | Danny Harris (USA) | 48.27 |
| 5. | David Patrick (USA) | 48.33 |

=== 3,000m Steeplechase ===
| RANK | 1989 WORLD BEST PERFORMERS | TIME |
|---|---|---|
| 1. | Peter Koech (KEN) | 8:05.35 |
| 2. | Patrick Sang (KEN) | 8:06.03 |
| 3. | Julius Kariuki (KEN) | 8:12.18 |
| 4. | Joseph Mahmoud (FRA) | 8:13.38 |
| 5. | Graeme Fell (CAN) | 8:15.80 |

=== High Jump ===
| RANK | 1989 WORLD BEST PERFORMERS | HEIGHT |
|---|---|---|
| 1. | Javier Sotomayor (CUB) | 2.44 |
| 2. | Patrik Sjöberg (SWE) | 2.40 |
| 3. | Hollis Conway (USA) | 2.39 |
| 4. | Hennadiy Avdyeyenko (URS) | 2.37 |
| 5. | Carlo Thränhardt (FRG) | 2.34 |
| 5. | Rudolf Povarnitsyn (URS) | 2.34 |
| 5. | Dalton Grant (GBR) | 2.34 |

=== Long Jump ===
| RANK | 1989 WORLD BEST PERFORMERS | DISTANCE |
|---|---|---|
| 1. | Larry Myricks (USA) | 8.70 |
| 2. | Carl Lewis (USA) | 8.54 |
| 3. | Mike Powell (USA) | 8.49 |
| 4. | Leroy Burrell (USA) | 8.37 |
| 5. | Vladimir Ratushkov (URS) | 8.33 |

=== Triple Jump ===
| RANK | 1989 WORLD BEST PERFORMERS | DISTANCE |
|---|---|---|
| 1. | Volodymyr Inozemtsev (URS) | 17.62 |
| 2. | Oleg Sakirkin (URS) | 17.58 |
| 3. | Mike Conley (USA) | 17.57 |
| 4. | Charles Simpkins (USA) | 17.53 |
| 5. | Kenny Harrison (USA) | 17.47 |

=== Discus ===
| RANK | 1989 WORLD BEST PERFORMERS | DISTANCE |
|---|---|---|
| 1. | Wolfgang Schmidt (GDR) | 70.92 |
| 2. | Mike Buncic (USA) | 68.88 |
| 3. | Luis Delís (CUB) | 68.28 |
| 4. | Jürgen Schult (GDR) | 68.12 |
| 5. | Vésteinn Hafsteinsson (ISL) | 67.64 |

=== Shot Put ===
| RANK | 1989 WORLD BEST PERFORMERS | DISTANCE |
|---|---|---|
| 1. | Ulf Timmermann (GDR) | 22.19 |
| 2. | Randy Barnes (USA) | 22.18 |
| 2. | Werner Günthör (SUI) | 22.18 |
| 4. | Jim Doehring (USA) | 21.57 |
| 5. | Aleksandr Bagach (URS) | 21.42 |

=== Hammer ===
| RANK | 1989 WORLD BEST PERFORMERS | DISTANCE |
|---|---|---|
| 1. | Heinz Weis (FRG) | 82.84 |
| 2. | Igor Astapkovich (URS) | 82.52 |
| 3. | Vasiliy Sidorenko (URS) | 82.30 |
| 4. | Yuriy Syedikh (URS) | 81.92 |
| 5. | Andrey Abduvaliyev (URS) | 81.00 |

=== Javelin (new design) ===
| RANK | 1989 WORLD BEST PERFORMERS | DISTANCE |
|---|---|---|
| 1. | Kazuhiro Mizoguchi (JPN) | 87.60 |
| 2. | Steve Backley (GBR) | 85.90 |
| 3. | Tom Petranoff (USA) | 85.34 |
| 4. | Volker Hadwich (GDR) | 84.84 |
| 5. | Peter Borglund (SWE) | 84.76 |

=== Pole Vault ===
| RANK | 1989 WORLD BEST PERFORMERS | HEIGHT |
|---|---|---|
| 1. | Sergey Bubka (URS) | 6.00 |
| — | Rodion Gataullin (URS) | 6.00 |
| 3. | Joe Dial (USA) | 5.90 |
| 4. | Grigoriy Yegorov (URS) | 5.81 |
| 4. | Tim Bright (USA) | 5.81 |

=== Decathlon ===
| RANK | 1989 WORLD BEST PERFORMERS | POINTS |
|---|---|---|
| 1. | Dave Johnson (USA) | 8549 |
| 2. | Christian Plaziat (FRA) | 8485 |
| 3. | Richardas Malakhovskis (URS) | 8437 |
| 4. | Christian Schenk (GDR) | 8351 |
| 5. | Michael Smith (CAN) | 8317 |

== Women's Best Year Performers ==
=== 60 metres ===
| RANK | 1989 WORLD BEST PERFORMERS | TIME |
|---|---|---|
| 1. | Nelli Cooman (NLD) | 7.05 |
| 2. | Gwen Torrence (USA) | 7.07 |
| 3. | Merlene Ottey (JAM) | 7.10 |
| 4. | Alice Brown (USA) | 7.11 |
| 5. | Olga Bogoslovskaya (URS) | 7.12 |

=== 100 metres ===
| RANK | 1989 WORLD BEST PERFORMERS | TIME |
|---|---|---|
| 1. | Dawn Sowell (USA) | 10.78 |
| 2. | Merlene Ottey (JAM) | 10.95 |
| 3. | Laurence Bily (FRA) | 11.04 |
| 4. | Evelyn Ashford (USA) | 11.05 |
| 5. | Sheila Echols (USA) | 11.07 |

=== 200 metres ===
| RANK | 1989 WORLD BEST PERFORMERS | TIME |
|---|---|---|
| 1. | Dawn Sowell (USA) | 22.04 |
| 2. | Evette de Klerk (RSA) | 22.06 |
| 3. | Merlene Ottey (JAM) | 22.21 |
| 4. | Silke Möller (GDR) | 22.23 |
| 5. | Dannette Young (USA) | 22.29 |

=== 400 metres ===
| RANK | 1989 WORLD BEST PERFORMERS | TIME |
|---|---|---|
| 1. | Ana Fidelia Quirot (CUB) | 50.01 |
| 2. | Pauline Davis (BAH) | 50.18 |
| 3. | Grit Breuer (GDR) | 50.48 |
| 4. | Grace Jackson (JAM) | 50.63 |
| 5. | Tatyana Alekseyeva (URS) | 50.74 |

=== 800 metres ===
| RANK | 1989 WORLD BEST PERFORMERS | TIME |
|---|---|---|
| 1. | Ana Fidelia Quirot (CUB) | 1:54.44 |
| 2. | Sigrun Wodars (GDR) | 1:55.70 |
| 3. | Doina Melinte (ROU) | 1:56.55 |
| 4. | Dalia Matuseviciene (URS) | 1:57.27 |
| 5. | Olga Dogadina (URS) | 1:58.0 |

=== 1,500 metres ===
| RANK | 1989 WORLD BEST PERFORMERS | TIME |
|---|---|---|
| 1. | Paula Ivan (ROU) | 3:59.23* |
| 2. | Doina Melinte (ROU) | 4:00.89 |
| 3. | Svetlana Kitova (URS) | 4:02.08 |
| 4. | Yvonne Murray (GBR) | 4:03.13 |
| 5. | Yvonne Mai (GDR) | 4:03.15 |

- Ivan ran 3:59.23 for 1500m on her way to the mile world record of 4:15.61 in Nice.

=== Mile ===
| RANK | 1989 WORLD BEST PERFORMERS | TIME |
|---|---|---|
| 1. | Paula Ivan (ROU) | 4:15.61 |
| 2. | Doina Melinte (ROU) | 4:20.39 |
| 3. | Svetlana Kitova (URS) | 4:22.52 |
| 4. | Lynn Williams (CAN) | 4:24.75 |
| 5. | Bev Nicholson (GBR) | 4:27.19 |

=== 3,000 metres ===
| RANK | 1989 WORLD BEST PERFORMERS | TIME |
|---|---|---|
| 1. | Paula Ivan (ROU) | 8:38.48 |
| 2. | Yvonne Murray (GBR) | 8:38.51 |
| 3. | Marie-Pierre Duros (FRA) | 8:38.97 |
| 4. | Elly van Hulst (NED) | 8:40.85 |
| 5. | PattiSue Plumer (USA) | 8:42.12 |

=== 5,000 metres ===
| RANK | 1989 WORLD BEST PERFORMERS | TIME |
|---|---|---|
| 1. | Kathrin Ulrich (GDR) | 14:59.01 |
| 2. | PattiSue Plumer (USA) | 15:00.00 |
| 3. | Lynn Williams (CAN) | 15:01.30 |
| 4. | Liz McColgan (GBR) | 15:14.54 |
| 5. | Päivi Tikkanen (FIN) | 15:15.76 |

=== 10,000 metres ===
| RANK | 1989 WORLD BEST PERFORMERS | TIME |
|---|---|---|
| 1. | Ingrid Kristiansen (NOR) | 30:48.51 |
| 2. | Kathrin Ulrich (GDR) | 31:33.92 |
| 3. | Viorica Ghican (ROU) | 31:46.43 |
| 4. | Iris Biba (GDR) | 31:52.09 |
| 5. | Akemi Matsuno (JPN) | 31:54.0 |

=== Half Marathon ===
| RANK | 1989 WORLD BEST PERFORMERS | TIME |
|---|---|---|
| 1. | Ingrid Kristiansen (NOR) | 1:08:31 |

=== Marathon ===
| RANK | 1989 WORLD BEST PERFORMERS | TIME |
|---|---|---|
| 1. | Ingrid Kristiansen (NOR) | 2:24:33 |
| 2. | Veronique Marot (GBR) | 2:25:56 |
| 3. | Wanda Panfil (POL) | 2:27:05 |
| 4. | Mun Gyong-Ae (PRK) | 2:27:16 |
| 5. | Kim Jones (USA) | 2:27:54 |

=== 60m Hurdles ===
| RANK | 1989 WORLD BEST PERFORMERS | TIME |
|---|---|---|
| 1. | Cornelia Oschkenat (GDR) | 7.73 |
| 2. | Ludmila Narozhilenko (URS) | 7.77 |
| 3. | Yordanka Donkova (BUL) | 7.78 |
| 4. | Jackie Joyner-Kersee (USA) | 7.81 |
| 5. | Yelizaveta Chernyshova (URS) | 7.82 |

=== 100m Hurdles ===
| RANK | 1989 WORLD BEST PERFORMERS | TIME |
|---|---|---|
| 1. | Cornelia Oschkenat (GDR) | 12.60 |
| 2. | Monique Éwanjé-Épée (FRA) | 12.65 |
| 3. | Yelizaveta Chernyshova (URS) | 12.68 |
| 3. | Mihaela Pogăcean (ROU) | 12.68 |
| 5. | Ludmila Narozhilenko (URS) | 12.69 |

=== 400m Hurdles ===
| RANK | 1989 WORLD BEST PERFORMERS | TIME |
|---|---|---|
| 1. | Sandra Farmer-Patrick (USA) | 53.37 |
| 2. | Myrtle Bothma (RSA) | 53.82 |
| 3. | Petra Krug (GDR) | 54.35 |
| 4. | Debbie Flintoff-King (AUS) | 54.42 |
| 5. | Sally Gunnell (GBR) | 54.64 |

=== High Jump ===
| RANK | 1989 WORLD BEST PERFORMERS | HEIGHT |
|---|---|---|
| 1. | Silvia Costa (CUB) | 2.04 m |
| 2. | Heike Balck (GDR) | 2.01 m |
| 3. | Jan Wohlschlag (USA) | 2.00 m |
| 3. | Alina Astafei (ROU) | 2.00 m |
| 3. | Heike Henkel (FRG) | 2.00 m |

=== Long Jump ===
| RANK | 1989 WORLD BEST PERFORMERS | DISTANCE |
|---|---|---|
| 1. | Galina Chistyakova (URS) | 7.24 m |
| 2. | Helga Radtke (GDR) | 7.15 m |
| 3. | Larisa Berezhnaya (URS) | 7.12 m |
| 4. | Marieta Ilcu (ROU) | 7.08 m |
| 5. | Nijolé Medvedeva (URS) | 6.98 m |

=== Shot Put ===
| RANK | 1989 WORLD BEST PERFORMERS | DISTANCE |
|---|---|---|
| 1. | Li Meisu (CHN) | 20.82 m |
| 2. | Heike Hartwig (GDR) | 20.78 m |
| 3. | Zhihong HuangCHN (25x17px) | 20.73 m |
| 4. | Astrid Kumbernuss (GDR) | 20.54 m |
| 5. | Natalya Lisovskaya (URS) | 20.50 m |

=== Javelin (old design) ===
| RANK | 1989 WORLD BEST PERFORMERS | DISTANCE |
|---|---|---|
| 1. | Petra Felke (GDR) | 76.88 |
| 2. | Trine Hattestad (NOR) | 71.12 |
| 3. | Beate Koch (GDR) | 70.76 |
| 4. | Karen Forkel (GDR) | 70.12 |
| 5. | Natalya Shikolenko (URS) | 69.38 |

=== Heptathlon ===
| RANK | 1989 WORLD BEST PERFORMERS | POINTS |
|---|---|---|
| 1. | Larisa Nikitina (URS) | 7007 |
| 2. | Anke Behmer (GDR) | 6686 |
| 3. | Remigija Nazaroviené (URS) | 6604 |
| 4. | Liliana Nastase (ROU) | 6602 |
| 5. | Sabine Braun (GDR) | 6575 |

== Marathons ==
=== International Races ===
| DATE | MARATHON | NATION | MEN'S WINNER | TIME | WOMEN'S WINNER | TIME |
|---|---|---|---|---|---|---|
| January 15 | Hamilton | Bermuda | (United Kingdom) James Doig | 2:26:46 | (United States) Sally Zimmer | 2:58:40 |
| January 15 | Marrakech | Morocco | (Belgium) Jean Weyts | 2:15:49 | (United States) Janis Klecker | 2:39:19 |
| January 29 | Osaka | Japan | — | — | (New Zealand) Lorraine Moller | 2:30:21 |
| February 5 | Oita | Japan | (Japan) Satoru Shimizu | 2:12:26 | — | — |
| February 5 | Valencia | Spain | (Poland) Miroslaw Dzienisik | 2:19:09 | (Spain) Elisenda Pucurull | 2:46:19 |
| February 12 | Manila | Philippines | (Brazil) Osmiro Souza da Silva | 2:24:35 | (Italy) Cesarina Taroni | 2:55:00 |
| February 26 | Seville | Spain | (Tanzania) Suleiman Nyambui | 2:16:59 | (Spain) Consuelo Alonso | 2:51:33 |
| March 5 | Los Angeles | United States | (Canada) Arthur Boileau | 2:13:01 | (Soviet Union) Zoya Ivanova | 2:34:42 |
| March 12 | Arusha | Tanzania | (Tanzania) Simon Naali | 2:14:40 | (Tanzania) Blanka James | 3:23:03 |
| March 12 | Hong Kong | Hong Kong | (United Kingdom) Kevin Ball | 2:38:44 | (Hong Kong) Ko Funglong | 3:41:59 |
| March 19 | Barcelona | Spain | (United States) Douglas Kurtis | 2:16:37 | (Belgium) Martine Vandegehuchte | 2:37:41 |
| March 19 | Tokyo | Japan | (Japan) Hiromi Taniguchi | 2:09:34 | — | — |
| April 9 | Bremem | West Germany | (West Germany) Heinz-Bernhardt Burger | 2:16:42 | (Romania) Ewa Wrzosek | 2:48:46 |
| April 16 | Rotterdam | Netherlands | (Ethiopia) Belayneh Dinsamo | 2:08:39 | (Romania) Elena Murgoci | 2:32:03 |
| April 16 | Vienna | Austria | (Tanzania) Alfredo Shahanga | 2:10:28 | (West Germany) Christa Vahlensieck | 2:34:46 |
| April 17 | Boston | United States | (Ethiopia) Abebe Mekonnen | 2:09:06 | (Norway) Ingrid Kristiansen | 2:24:33 |
| April 23 | Budapest | Hungary | (East Germany) Stefan Seidemann | 2:19:52 | (Czechoslovakia) Dana Hajna | 2:45:50 |
| April 23 | London | United Kingdom | (Kenya) Douglas Wakiihuri | 2:09:03 | (United Kingdom) Veronique Marot | 2:25:56 |
| April 23 | Lyon | France | (Algeria) Mohamed Youkmane | 2:14:42 | (France) M Carrara | 2:58:59 |
| April 23 | Munich | West Germany | (West Germany) Herbert Steffny | 2:11:30 | (Brazil) Janete Mayal | 2:37:04 |
| April 23 | Rotorua | New Zealand | (New Zealand) Paul Ballinger | 2:18:21 | (New Zealand) Bernardine Portenski | 2:46:02 |
| April 30 | Les Herbiers | France | (Hungary) Csaba Szűcs | 2:14:29 | (Poland) Lydia Camberg | 2:43:07 |
| April 30 | Madrid | Spain | (Brazil) Jose Cesar Sousa | 2:15:16 | (Spain) Elena Cobos | 2:41:14 |
| April 30 | Paris | France | (United Kingdom) Steve Brace | 2:13:03 | (Japan) Kazue Kojima | 2:29:23 |
| May 1 | Belfast | Northern Ireland | (England) Ian Bloomfield | 2:20:45 | (Republic of Ireland) Rosaleen Hayden | 2:58:31 |
| May 1 | Rome | Italy | (Italy) Guido Genicco | 2:20:43 | (Kenya) Pascaline Wangui | 2:46:28 |
| May 7 | Amsterdam | Netherlands | (Netherlands) Gerard Genicco | 2:13:52 | (Poland) Gabriela Gorzynska | 2:47:16 |
| May 7 | Long Beach | United States | (New Zealand) Rex Wilson | 2:12:27 | (China) Wen Yanming | 2:43:33 |
| May 7 | Pittsburgh | United States | (United States) Kenneth Martin | 2:15:28 | (United States) Margareth Groos | 2:32:39 |
| May 7 | Vancouver | Canada | (Israel) Shem-Tov Sabag | 2:19:41 | (Canada) Anne Mangal | 2:50:05 |
| May 21 | Hamburg | West Germany | (Brazil) Nivaldo Filho | 2:13:21 | (Netherlands) Jolanda Homminga | 2:40:28 |
| June 3 | Stockholm | Sweden | (United Kingdom) David Clarke | 2:13:24 | (Sweden) Evy Palm | 2:33:26 |
| June 4 | Auckland | New Zealand | (New Zealand) Murray Fleming | 2:18:28 | (New Zealand) Helen Moros | 2:46:35 |
| June 11 | Redcliffe | Australia | (United Kingdom) Lawrence Adams | 2:22:51 | (Australia) Jan Fedrick | 2:51:09 |
| June 25 | Rio de Janeiro | Brazil | (Brazil) Joao de Souza | 2:16:07 | (Brazil) Evany Souza | 2:53:47 |
| July 9 | San Francisco | United States | (South Africa) Ernest Tjela | 2:15:01 | (United States) Stephanie Robertson | 3:09:08 |
| July 15 | Nuremberg | West Germany | (Austria) Andreas Achleitner | 2:32:03 | (West Germany) Ulrike Pietzsch | 3:03:07 |
| July 23 | Brisbane | Australia | (Australia) Bradley Camp | 2:10:11 | (Australia) Jan Fedrick | 2:51:30 |
| July 30 | Blumenau | Brazil | (Brazil) Valmir de Carvalho | 2:17:52 | (Brazil) Nercy Freitas de Costa | 2:47:47 |
| August 12 | Helsinki | Finland | (Finland) Jouni Kortelainen | 2:18:58 | (Finland) Ritva Lemettinen | 2:40:30 |
| August 13 | Adelaide | Australia | (Australia) John Duck | 2:25:50 | (United Kingdom) Leslie Watson | 2:49:49 |
| August 20 | Reykjavik | Iceland | (United Kingdom) Robin Nash | 2:25:49 | (Netherlands) Wilma Rusman | 2:47:25 |
| August 26 | Rio de Janeiro | Brazil | (Brazil) Jose Carlos Santana | 2:18:19 | (Brazil) Marinete Quintanilha | 2:56:44 |
| September 9 | Oslo | Norway | (United Kingdom) Ronald Boreham | 2:19:05 | (Soviet Union) Olga Durynina | 2:38:15 |
| September 17 | Buenos Aires | Argentina | (Argentina) Juan Pablo Juarez | 2:16:03 | (Argentina) Ana Maria Nielsen | 2:43:58 |
| September 24 | Brussels | Belgium | (United Kingdom) Pavel Klimes | 2:16:46 | (Belgium) Nelly Aerts | 2:36:49 |
| September 24 | Ciudad Mexico | Mexico | (Ethiopia) Tesfaye Tafa | 2:17:54 | (Mexico) Maria Flora Morena | 2:44:34 |
| September 24 | Montreal | Canada | (Canada) Peter Maher | 2:20:07 | (Canada) Helene Rochefort | 2:39:46 |
| September 24 | Portland | United States | (Japan) Tsugumichi Sadakata | 2:18:45 | (United States) Debra Myra | 2:44:09 |
| October 1 | Berlin | — | (Tanzania) Alfredo Shahanga | 2:10:11 | (Finland) Päivi Tikkanen | 2:28:45 |
| October 8 | Melbourne | Australia | (Japan) Takeshi Soh | 2:18:13 | (Australia) Colleen Stephens | '2:49:18 |
| October 8 | Penang | Malaysia | (Malaysia) Amaran Raman | 2:35:09 | (India) Sunita Anand Godara | 3:03:02 |
| October 8 | Venice | Italy | (Italy) Marco Milani | 2:16:08 | (Italy) Emma Scaunich | 2:36:02 |
| October 15 | Beijing | China | (Denmark) Peter Dall | 2:12:47 | (North Korea) Mun Gyong-Ae | 2:27:16 |
| October 15 | Istanbul | Turkey | (Turkey) Aydin Ceken | 2:27:41 | — | — |
| October 22 | Athens | Greece | (Netherlands) Jan van Rijthoven | 2:23:19 | (United States) Leslie Lewis | 2:37:42 |
| October 22 | Frankfurt | West Germany | (West Germany) Herbert Steffny | 2:13:51 | (West Germany) Iris Biba | 2:33:14 |
| October 22 | Hamilton | New Zealand | (New Zealand) Robert Schuddeboom | 2:25:23 | (New Zealand) Irene Wilson | 3:23:45 |
| October 22 | Split | Croatia | (Netherlands) Michel de Maat | 2:26:16 | (Soviet Union) Tatyana Ulyanova | 3:10:18 |
| October 29 | Chicago | United States | (United Kingdom) Paul Davies-Hale | 2:11:25 | (United States) Lisa Weidenbach | 2:28:15 |
| October 30 | Dublin | (Republic of Ireland) Ireland | (Republic of Ireland) John Griffin | 2:16:45 | (Republic of Ireland) Pauline Nolen | 2:44:32 |
| November 5 | New York City | United States | (Tanzania) Juma Ikangaa | 2:08:01 | (Norway) Ingrid Kristiansen | 2:25:30 |
| November 6 | Lisbon | Portugal | (Portugal) Joaquim Silva | 2:16:56 | (Brazil) Evany Souza | 2:47:27 |
| November 12 | Iraklion | Greece | (United States) Christopher Prior | 2:19:05 | (United Kingdom) Glynis Penny | 2:45:27 |
| November 19 | Rome | Italy | (Algeria) Mohamed Salmi | 2:13:17 | (Kenya) Pascaline Wangui | 2:39:10 |
| November 19 | Tokyo | Japan | — | — | (Soviet Union) Lyubov Klochko | 2:31:33 |
| November 26 | Bangkok | Thailand | (United States) Douglas Kurtis | 2:20:15 | (Italy) Cesarina Taroni | 2:47:53 |
| November 26 | Kawaguchiko | Japan | (Poland) Wieslaw Perszke | 2:18:10 | (Japan) Reiko Hirosawa | 2:53:55 |
| December 3 | Fukuoka | Japan | (Portugal) Manuel Matias | 2:12:54 | — | — |
| December 10 | Honolulu | United States | (Tanzania) Simon Naali | 2:11:47 | (Netherlands) Carla Beurskens | 2:31:50 |

== Births ==
- January 1 — Fatih Avan, Turkish javelin thrower
- January 24 — Gong Lijiao, Chinese shot putter
- February 25 — Vira Rebryk, Ukrainian javelin thrower
- June 15 — Teddy Tamgho, French triple jumper
- June 24 — Teklemariam Medhin, Eritrean long-distance runner
- July 1 — Abdinasir Said Ibrahim, Somali distance runner
- August 16 — Wang Hao, Chinese race walker
- September 12 — Aberu Kebede, Ethiopian long distance runner
- December 5 — Linet Masai, Kenyan distance runner

== Deaths ==
- June 22 — Lee Calhoun (56), American athlete (b. 1933)
