= Pyongyang Marathon =

Annual race held in Pyongyang, North Korea

Coordinates: 39°2′58″N 125°46′31″E

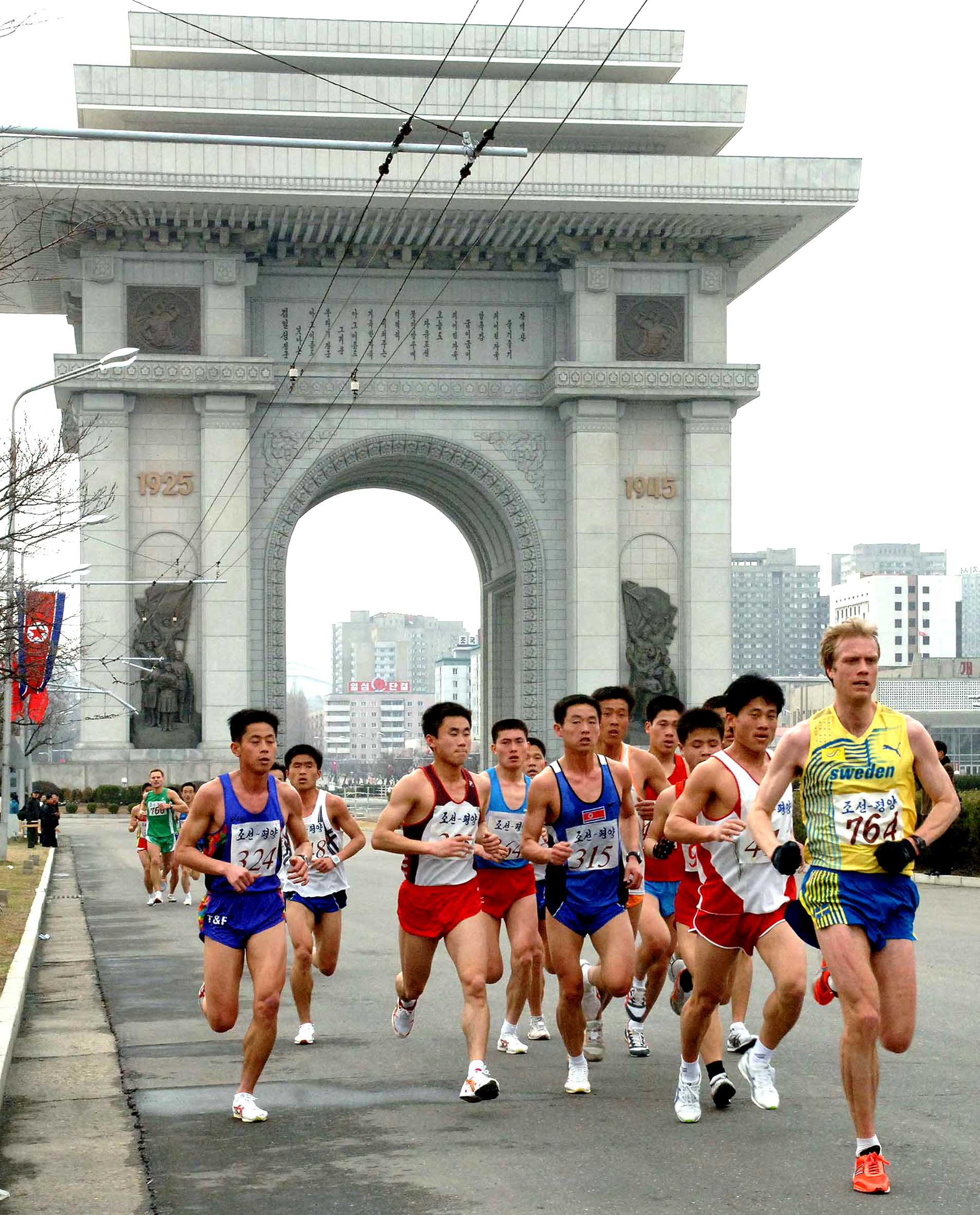
- Participants in the 2012 Pyongyang Marathon running past the Arch of Triumph
- Date: April
- Location: Pyongyang, North Korea
- Event type: Road
- Distance: Marathon, half-marathon, 10 km, 5 km
- Established: 1981
- Course records: Men's: 2:10:50 (1996) (North Korea) Kim Jung-won; Women's: 2:25:48 (2025) (North Korea) Jon Su-gyong
- Website: Pyongyang Marathon

- Pyongyang Marathon

Korean name
- Chosŏn'gŭl: 만경대상국제마라손경기대회
- Hancha: 萬景臺賞國際마라손競技大會
- Revised Romanization: Man-gyeongdaesang-gukje-marason-gyeonggidaehoe
- McCune–Reischauer: Man'gyŏngdaesang-gukche-marason-gyŏnggidaehoe

Pyongyang International Marathon, previously known as Mangyongdae Prize International Marathon, is an annual marathon race contested each April in Pyongyang, the capital of North Korea.

The marathon was held for the first time in 1981 for men, and the women's event was initiated in 1984. The 2009 race was the 22nd event. The competition was opened for international runners again in 2000. The race starts and finishes at the Rungrado May Day Stadium or Kim Il Sung Stadium and runs along the Taedong River. At the 2010 edition of the race, Ukrainian Ivan Babaryka became the first European runner to win in Pyongyang in 24 years. The race in 2012 was held as part of celebrations for the 100 years since Kim Il Sung's birth and featured one of the race's closest ever finishes: Oleksandr Matviychuk and Pak Song-chol were given identical times (2:12:54 hours), with the Ukrainian guest taking the title.

The 2015 marathon was initially closed to foreigners because of concerns about Ebola, but this decision has since been reversed after the reopening of the North Korean border in March 2015. The marathon was held in 2016, but did not meet IAAF specifications for an IAAF Bronze Label Road Race that it had on previous years. In 2020, it was announced that the marathon would be cancelled for that year due to the ongoing coronavirus outbreak in China. The 2021 edition was also cancelled due to the same reason as well as the 2022 edition.

The marathon resumed in 2025.

The 2026 edition of the Pyongyang Marathon was cancelled without a specifed reason behind the decision.

== Course records ==
- Men: 2:10:50, Kim Jung-won, 1996
- Women: 2:25:48, Jon Su-gyong, 2025

== List of winners ==
Key: Course record

Edition	Year	Men's winner	Time (h:m:s)	Women's winner	Time (h:m:s)
37th	2025	Pak Kum-dang (PRK)	2:12:08	Jon Su-gyong (PRK)	2:25:48
—	2020-2024	Marathons not held due to COVID-19 pandemic			
36th	2019	Ri Kang-bom (PRK)	2:11:19	Ri Kwang-ok (PRK)	2:26:58
35th	2018	Ri Kang-bom (PRK)	2:12:53	Kim Hye-song (PRK)	2:27:31
34th	2017	Pak Chol (PRK)	2:14:56	Jo Un-ok (PRK)	2:29:22
33rd	2016	Pak Chol-gwang (PRK)	2:14:10	Kim Ji-hyang (PRK)	2:28:06
32nd	2015	Lee Yong-ho (PRK)	2:16:04	Kim Hye-song (PRK)	2:29:12
31st	2014	Pak Chol (PRK)	2:12:26	Kim Hye-gyong (PRK)	2:27:05
30th	2013	Ketema Bekele (ETH)	2:13:04	Kim Mi-gyong (PRK)	2:26:32
29th	2012	Oleksandr Matviychuk (UKR)	2:12:54	Kim Mi-gyong (PRK)	2:30:41
28th	2011	Oleg Marusin (RUS)	2:13:58	Ro Un-ok (PRK)	2:32:06
27th	2010	Ivan Babaryka (UKR)	2:13:56	Kim Kum-ok (PRK)	2:27:34
26th	2009	Wang Zemin (CHN)	2:14:21	Phyo Un-suk (PRK)	2:28:34
25th	2008	Pak Song-chol (PRK)	2:14:22	Phyo Un-suk (PRK)	2:28:39
24th	2007	Pak Song-chol (PRK)	2:12:41	Jong Yong-ok (PRK)	2:26:02
23rd	2006	Ri Kyong-chol (PRK)	2:13:15	Jo Bun-hui (PRK)	2:27:22
22nd	2005	Ri Kyong-chol (PRK)	2:11:36	Ham Bong-sil (PRK)	2:31:46
21st	2004	Morris Mwangi (KEN)	2:16:41	O Song-suk (PRK)	2:36:10
20th	2003	Jong Myong-chol (PRK)	2:15:05	Ham Bong-sil (PRK)	2:27:48
19th	2002	Zacharia Mpolokeng (RSA)	2:15:05	Ham Bong-sil (PRK)	2:26:23
18th	2001	Kim Jung-won (PRK)	2:11:48	Jong Yong-ok (PRK)	2:28:32
17th	2000	Nelson Ndereva (KEN)	2:11:05	Hong Myong-hui (PRK)	2:31:28
16th	1999	Unknown			
15th	1998	Unknown			
14th	1997	Unknown			
13th	1996	Kim Jung-won (PRK)	2:10:50	Kim Chang-ok (PRK)	2:27:02
12th	1995	Unknown		Mun Gyong-ae (PRK)	2:30:37
11th	1994	Unknown			
10th	1993	Unknown			
9th	1992	Unknown		Mun Gyong-ae (PRK)	2:38:44
—	1990-1991	Marathon not held			
8th	1989	Choe Chol-ho (PRK)	2:15:27	Mun Gyong-ae (PRK)	2:33:48
7th	1988	Cho Hui-bok (PRK)	2:14:33	Madina Biktagirova (URS)	2:38:00
—	1987	Marathon not held			
6th	1986	Sergey Krestyaninov (URS)	2:14:19	Elena Murgoci (ROM)	2:37:11
5th	1985	Choe Il-sop (PRK)	2:13:25	Tatyana Bultot (URS)	2:35:36
4th	1984	Dmitriy Feostikov (URS)	2:14:36	Nadezhda Tishkova (URS)	2:40:34
3rd	1983	Unknown		Yu Song-hui (PRK)	2:37:14
2nd	1982	Lee Jong-hyong (PRK)	2:15:17	Women's marathon not held	
1st	1981	Unknown	2:17:18	Women's marathon not held	

== See also ==
- Tourism in North Korea
