= Asian Marathon Championships =

Marathon running competition in Asia

The Asian Marathon Championships is a biennial international competition in marathon road running for Asian athletes. Organised by the Asian Athletics Association, its creation in 1988 followed decision to drop the 42.195-kilometre (26-mile and 385-yard) race from the programme of events at the Asian Athletics Championships. In that competition, championship marathons were held for men in 1973 and 1975, then finally for both men and women at the 1985.

The first discrete men's and women's Asian championship marathons in 1988 were held at different locations. The men's side was incorporated into that year's Lake Biwa Marathon while the women's side was held within the Nagoya Women's Marathon. The first winners (Masayuki Nishi and Xie Lihua) were not the fastest Asian runners in those races, as only those specifically chosen to represent their nation were eligible to win the Asian title. The following edition in 1990 saw both sexes compete at the same location and again the races were hosted within a major annual marathon race, this time the Seoul International Marathon, where Korean racers Kim Won-Tak and Lee Mi-Ok claimed both the Asian and Seoul titles.

The 1992 Asian Marathon Championships were held in Bandung, Indonesia, outside of a major race for the first time. This was reverted soon after in 1994, when the men's race was contained at the Beppu-Ōita Marathon and the women in Nagoya for a second time. Since then, each occurrence of the championship has been in one location for both sexes alongside a major city marathon. The Pattaya Marathon has hosted the event twice (2000 and 2011), while the Hong Kong Marathon has served as the venue three times (2002, 2008 and 2013).

East Asian runners have been the most successful at the competition, with the Japanese topping the rankings with nine men's titles and four women's titles across the championship's history. China, South Korea and North Korea have each won four titles between the men's and women's races. North Korea's Kim Kum-Ok is the most successful runner in competition history – she is a three-time winner of the women's championship (2006, 2008 and 2013). Kenichi Kawakubo, Mohammed Abduh Bakhet and Zhang Shujing are the only other runners to have won the championship twice.

== Editions ==
- First three championships held within Asian Athletics Championships

Edition	Year	Race	City	Country	Date	Countries	Athletes
—	1973	Asian Athletics Championships	Marikina	Philippines	23 November		
—	1975	Asian Athletics Championships	Seoul	South Korea	14 June		
—	1985	Asian Athletics Championships	Jakarta	Indonesia	29 September		
1	1988	Lake Biwa Marathon/ Nagoya Women's Marathon	Otsu/Nagoya	Japan	13 March/ 6 March		
2	1990	Seoul International Marathon	Seoul	South Korea	18 March		
3	1992	—N/a	Bandung	Indonesia	4 October		
4	1994	Beppu-Ōita Marathon/ Nagoya Women's Marathon	Oita/Nagoya	Japan	6 February/ 13 March		
5	1996	Chuncheon Marathon	Chuncheon	South Korea	27 October		
6	1998	Ayutthaya Marathon	Ayutthaya	Thailand	8 February		
7	2000	Pattaya Marathon	Pattaya	Thailand	2 July		
8	2002	Hong Kong Marathon	Hong Kong	Hong Kong, China	24 February		
9	2004	JoongAng Seoul Marathon	Seoul	South Korea	7 November		
10	2006	Beijing Marathon	Beijing	China	15 October		
11	2008	Hong Kong Marathon	Hong Kong	Hong Kong, China	17 February		
12	2010	Pune Marathon	Pune	India	5 December		
13	2011	Pattaya Marathon	Pattaya	Thailand	17 July		
14	2013	Hong Kong Marathon	Hong Kong	Hong Kong, China	24 February		
15	2015	Hong Kong Marathon	Hong Kong	Hong Kong, China	25 January		
16	2017	—N/a	Dongguan	China	26 November		
17	2019	—N/a	Dongguan	China	22 December		
19	2024	Hong Kong Marathon	Hong Kong	Hong Kong, China	21 January		
20	2025	Jiaxing Marathon	Jiaxing	China	30 March		

== Medallists ==
=== Men ===
Year	Gold		Silver		Bronze	
1973	Cho Je-hyung (KOR)	2:27:31	Park Chang-yuel (KOR)	2:33:45	Jit Bahadur Chetri (NEP)	2:33:45
1975	Sueki Tanaka (JPN)	2:32:06	Susumu Sato (JPN)	2:37:51	Jit Bahadur Chetri (NEP)	2:39:06
1985	Ling Jong-hyen (PRK)	2:20:29	Tomio Sueyoshi (JPN)	2:24:26	Choe Il-sop (PRK)	2:24:52
1988	Masayuki Nishi (JPN)	2:15:32	Kim Chang-keun (KOR)	2:26:56	Wu Zhihan (CHN)	2:29:39
1990	Kim Won-tak (KOR)	2:11:38	Ryuji Kondo (JPN)	2:14:25	Seon Jin-soo (KOR)	2:15:26
1992	Eduardus Nabunome (INA)	2:20:23	Ryoichi Enaidani (JPN)	2:21:17	Yoo Young-hoon (KOR)	2:23:27
1994	Yukio Suzuki (JPN)	2:19:04	Eduardus Nabunome (INA)	2:21:09	Kazumi Sakamoto (JPN)	2:21:38
1996	Norihiro Otoshi (JPN)	2:14:02	Tatsuya Hoshi (JPN)	2:14:03	Baek Seung-do (KOR)	2:14:05
1998	Kenichi Kawakubo (JPN)	2:20:03	Koji Koyanagi (JPN)	2:24:51	Vijay Singh (IND)	2:27:19
2000	Kenichi Kawakubo (JPN)	2:26:06	Sarath Prasanna Gamage (SRI)	2:28:25	Yukiyasu Ogura (JPN)	2:30:03
2002	Satoshi Osaki (JPN)	2:16:46	Kurao Umeki (JPN)	2:18:03	Maung Maung Nge (MYA)	2:23:15
2004	Kim Yi-yong (KOR)	2:11:32	Masami Soeta (JPN)	2:14:34	Han Gang (CHN)	2:15:12
2006	Kenichi Kita (JPN)	2:15:37	Takhir Mamashayev (KAZ)	2:15:58	Yohei Sato (JPN)	2:16:39
2008	Koichiro Fukuoka (JPN)	2:16:50	Ser-Od Bat-Ochir (MGL)	2:20:18	Valery Pisarev (KGZ)	2:21:45
2010	Mohammed Abduh Bakhet (QAT)	2:17:34	Yusuke Kataoka (JPN)	2:20:28	Deep Chand (IND)	2:20:37
2011	Mohammed Abduh Bakhet (QAT)	2:21:06	Teruto Ozaki (JPN)	2:23:09	Kenji Takeuchi (JPN)	2:25:33
2013	Ser-Od Bat-Ochir (MGL)	2:17:56	Andrey Petrov (UZB)	2:20:24	Kenzo Kawabata (JPN)	2:22:22
2015	Shingo Igarshi (JPN)	2:14:29	Pak Chol (PRK)	2:16:09	Olonbayar Jamsran (MGL)	2:22:49
2017	Gopi Thonakal (IND)	2:15:48	Andrey Petrov (UZB)	2:15:51	Tseveenravdan Byambajav (MGL)	2:16:14
2019	Daichi Kamino (JPN)	2:12:18	Ri Kang-bom (PRK)	2:12:21	Ryoichi Matsuo (JPN)	2:14:32
2024	Man Singh (IND)	2:14:19	Huang Yongzheng (CHN)	2:15:24	Ilya Tyapkin (KGZ)	2:18:17
2025	Han Il-ryong (PRK)	2:11:18	Chen Tianyu (CHN)	2:11:50	Tatsuya Maruyama (JPN)	2:11:56

=== Women ===
Year	Gold		Silver		Bronze	
1985	Asha Agarwal (IND)	2:48:53	Yuko Gordon (HKG)	2:54:16	Sun-Bok Ki (PRK)	2:57:28
1988	Xie Lihua (CHN)	2:31:43	Yoshiko Hidaka (JPN)	2:40:29	Mar-Mar Min (MYA)	2:41:52
1990	Lee Mi-Ok (KOR)	2:37:15	Kim Yen-Ju (KOR)	2:37:26	Eri Nagamine (JPN)	2:49:53
1992	Sunita Godara (IND)	2:53:12	Yi-Lo Man (HKG)	2:55:58	Yoshiko Hirohama (JPN)	2:57:11
1994	Eriko Asai (JPN)	2:30:30	Akiyo Goto (JPN)	2:43:41	Winnie Lai-Chu Ng (HKG)	2:36:33
1996	Yukari Komatsu (JPN)	2:37:54	Toshiko Mori (JPN)	2:38:04	Bang Sun-Hee (KOR)	2:39:48
1998	Tian Mei (CHN)	2:46:47	Vally Sathyabhama (IND)	3:06:07	Indiresh Dhiraj (IND)	3:19:21
2000	Sunisa Sailomyen (THA)	2:58:14	Christabel Martes (PHI)	3:05:07	Winnie Lai-Chu Ng (HKG)	3:09:43
2002	Zhang Shujing (CHN)	2:36:27	Mio Kiuchi (JPN)	2:38:35	Hideko Yoshimura (JPN)	2:42:21
2004	Zhang Shujing (CHN)	2:36:22	Choi Kyung-Hee (KOR)	2:38:03	Bai Xue (CHN)	2:42:21
2006	Kim Kum-ok (PRK)	2:35:16	Zhang Shujing (CHN)	2:35:24	Hyong-Sun Oh (PRK)	2:36:48
2008	Kim Kum-ok (PRK)	2:36:43	Jong Yong-Ok (PRK)	2:36:43	Mika Hikchi (JPN)	2:36:50
2010	Hiromi Ominami (JPN)	2:44:19	Viktoriia Poliudina (KGZ)	2:48:46	Chi Ngan Chow (HKG)	3:01:22
2011	Noriko Higuchi (JPN)	2:44:10	Jiang Xiaoli (CHN)	2:52:24	Thi-Binh Pham (VIE)	2:53:09
2013	Kim Kum-ok (PRK)	2:32:21	Kumi Ogura (JPN)	2:35:02	Iuliia Andreeva (KGZ)	2:39:49
2015	Kim Hye Gyong (PRK)	2:31:46	Kim Mi Gyong (PRK)	2:36:08	Gulzhanat Zhanatbek (KAZ)	2:38:36
2017	Kim Hye Gyong (PRK)	2:28:35	Keiko Nogami (JPN)	2:29:05	Jo Un-ok (PRK)	2:30:01
2019	Ri Kwang-ok (PRK)	2:30:56	Mao Uesugi (JPN)	2:31:57	Kim Ji-hyang (PRK)	2:32:10
2024	Galbadrakh Khishigsaikhan (MGL)	2:33:50	Gulshanoi Satarova (KGZ)	2:36:31	Li Yingmei (CHN)	2:40:13
2025	Wu Bing (CHN)	2:26:01	Ri Kwang-ok (PRK)	2:26:07	Galbadrakh Khishigsaikhan (MGL)	2:28:56

== All time medal table (from 1988) ==
Rank	Nation	Gold	Silver	Bronze	Total
1	Japan	14	15	11	40
2	North Korea	7	5	3	15
3	China	5	4	4	13
4	South Korea	3	3	4	10
5	India	3	1	3	7
6	Mongolia	2	1	3	6
7	Qatar	2	0	0	2
8	Indonesia	1	1	0	2
9	Thailand	1	0	0	1
10	Kyrgyzstan	0	2	3	5
11	Uzbekistan	0	2	0	2
12	Hong Kong	0	1	3	4
13	Kazakhstan	0	1	1	2
14	Philippines	0	1	0	1
14	Sri Lanka	0	1	0	1
16	Myanmar	0	0	2	2
17	Vietnam	0	0	1	1
Totals (17 entries)		38	38	38	114

== See also ==
- Marathons at the Asian Games
