= Kim Kum-ok =

North Korean runner and politician (born 1988)

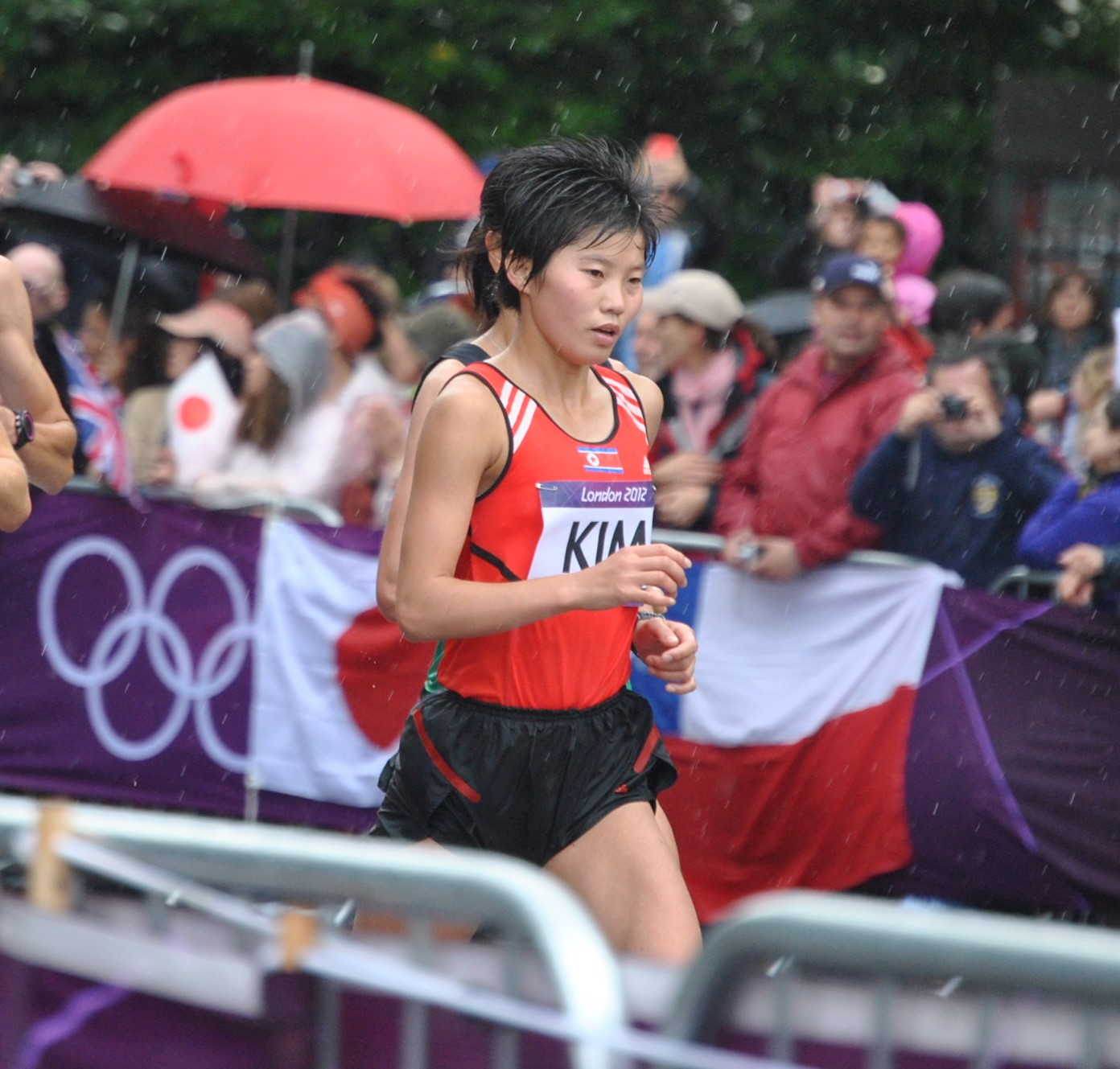
- Kim at the 2012 London Olympics

Personal information
- Born: December 9, 1988 (age 37) Pyongyang, North Korea
- Height: 1.6 m (5 ft 3 in)
- Weight: 48 kg (106 lb)

Sport
- Country: North Korea
- Sport: Athletics
- Event: Marathon
- Team: April 25 Sports Team

Korean name
- Hangul: 김금옥
- RR: Gim Geumok
- MR: Kim Kŭmok
Medal record
Summer Universiade
Gold medal – first place	2007 Bangkok	Half marathon
East Asian Games
Gold medal – first place	2009 Hong Kong	Half marathon
Asian Games
Bronze medal – third place	2010 Guangzhou	Half marathon

Kim Kum-ok (Korean: 김금옥; born December 9, 1988) is a female long-distance runner and politician from North Korea, who specializes in the half marathon and marathon events. She represents the April 25 Sports Team.

Kim ran in the Pyongyang Marathon in 2006 and took third with a time of 2:29:25. She improved for the 2007 edition, setting a marathon personal best of 2:26:56 to take second place. She had her first success at collegiate level, winning the half marathon at the 2007 Summer Universiade. Having won at the age of eighteen, the win was North Korea's second ever title at the Universiade. She ran at the Beijing Marathon later that year and managed tenth place.

At the Hong Kong Marathon, she had her first victory over the distance. She represented North Korea at the 2008 Summer Olympics and took twelfth place in the Olympic marathon race. The following year she returned to the Pyongyang Marathon and finished second again, this time to Phyo Un-suk. She ran at the 2009 World Championships in Athletics later that year and finished in twentieth place in the World Championship marathon race with a time of 2:31:24 (the best performer of the North Korean team). She ended her 2009 season by running a half marathon best of 1:11:55 to win at the 2009 East Asian Games.

In her fourth attempt at the course, Kim won the Pyongyang Marathon in 2:27:34, running her second fastest ever marathon and seeing off two-time champion Jong Yong-ok to take the honours.

Kim was elected to North Korea's Supreme People's Assembly in the 2009 North Korean parliamentary election, representing the 609th Electoral District, and in 2014, representing the 606th.

== Achievements ==
Year	Competition	Venue	Position	Event	Notes
Representing North Korea
2006	Asian Marathon Championships	Beijing, China	1st	Marathon	2:35:16
2007	Universiade	Bangkok, Thailand	1st	Half marathon	1:12:31
2008	Hong Kong Marathon	Hong Kong, PR China	1st	Marathon	2:36:43
2008	Olympic Games	Beijing, PR China	12th	Marathon	2:30:01
2009	World Championships	Berlin, Germany	20th	Marathon	2:31:24
2009	East Asian Games	Bangkok, Thailand	1st	Half marathon	1:11.55
2010	Pyongyang Marathon	Pyongyang, North Korea	1st	Marathon	2:27:34
2010	Asian Games	Guangzhou, China	3rd	Marathon	2:27:06
2012	Olympic Games	London, United Kingdom	48th	Marathon	2:33:30
2013	Asian Marathon Championships	Hong Kong, China	1st	Marathon	2:32:21
2016	Olympic Games	Rio, Brazil	49th	Marathon	2:38:24

== Personal bests ==
- Half marathon – 1:11:55 hrs (2009)
- Marathon – 2:26:56 hrs (2007)
