= Ri Kang-bom =

North Korean athlete (born 1993)

Personal information
- Nationality: North Korean
- Born: 25 April 1993 (age 33)

Sport
- Sport: Athletics
- Event: Marathon

Achievements and titles
- Personal best(s): 5000m: 14:26.5 (Pyongyang, 2018); Marathon: 2:11:19 (Pyongyang, 2019)
Medal record
Men's athletics
Representing North Korea
Asian Marathon Championships
Silver medal – second place	2019 Dongguan	Marathon

Ri Kang-bom (born 25 April 1993) is a North Korean marathon runner. He was a silver medalist at the 2019 Asian Marathon Championships.

== Career ==
Ri went into the Hong Kong Marathon in February 2012 with a personal best of 2:25:20 for the marathon.

He ran 2:23:42 to earn sixth place in the men's marathon at the Asian Games in Jakarta–Palembang in 2018. He won the Pyongyang Marathon in April 2018 with a time of 2:12:53.

In 2019, he set a personal best time of 2:11:19 in winning the Pyongyang Marathon. In the December of that year, he finished as runner-up at the Asian Marathon Championships held in Dongguan, China. He was leading the race into the closing stages but mistakenly followed a television vehicle off course and away from the route, which enabled Japanese runner Daichi Kamino to overtake him for the win with Ri finishing second in a time of 2:12:21.
