= Pune International Marathon =

Marathon held in Pune

- 2013 logo with theme of "Run for Mother"
- Date: Early December
- Location: Pune, India
- Event type: Road running
- Distance: Marathon
- Established: 1983
- Course records: Men: 2:12:18 (2012Jan) (Ethiopia) Hosea Rutto; Women: 2:38:41 (2010) (Ethiopia) Birzah Tekele
- Website: Pune International Marathon

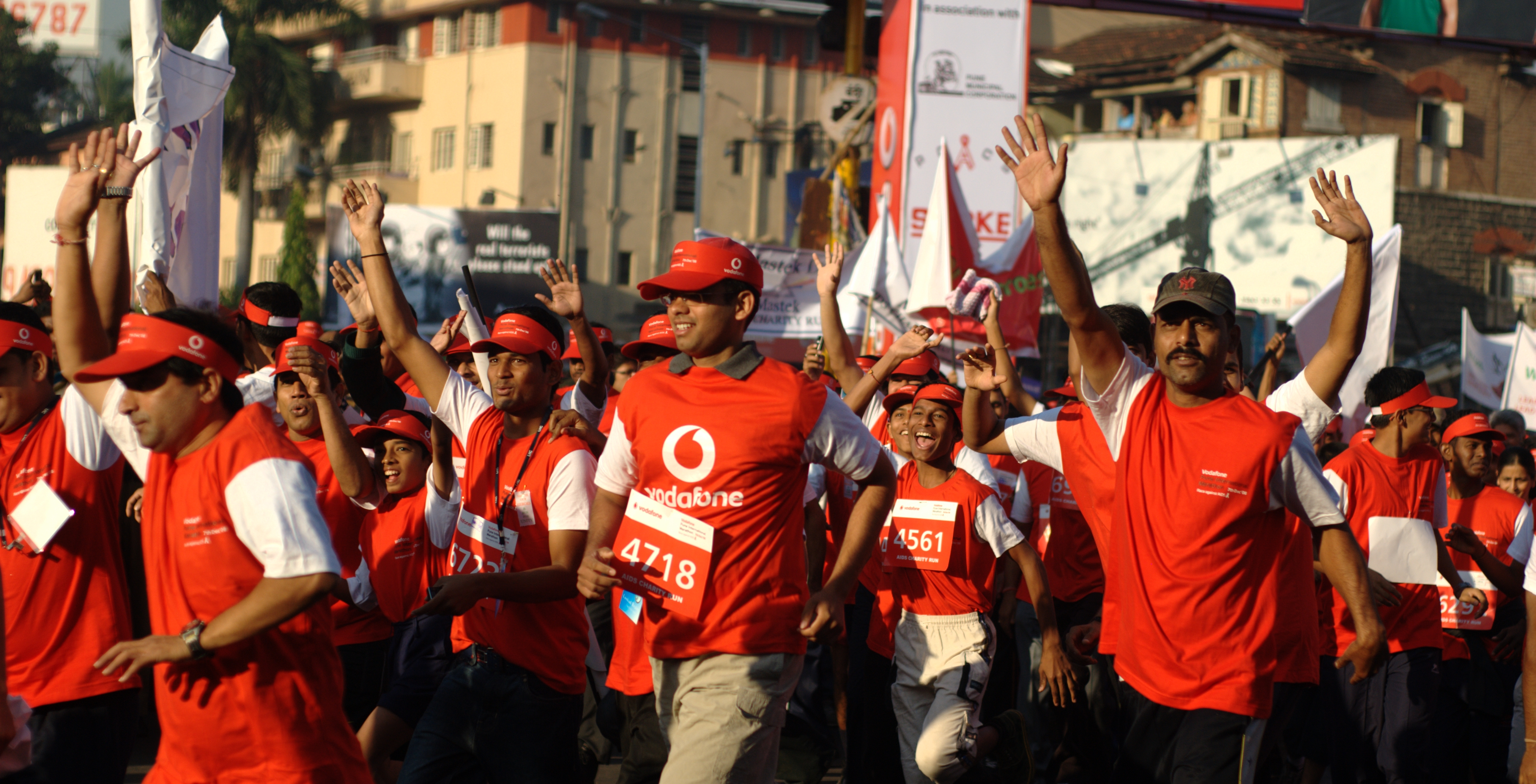
Fun runners at the 2008 event

The Pune International Marathon is an annual marathon foot-race held in Pune, India. The first edition of the race was held on September 25, 1983, and the 36th edition will be held in December 2022. It attracts many international participants, who compete with local and national runners in the distinct climate of the Indian subcontinent. It hosted the Asian Marathon Championship race in 2010.

The event also organizes a short celebrity run in which film personalities and national athletes participate and raise money for charitable causes.

In its 21st edition, held in 2006, the event attracted over 50,000 runners from India and around the world. Corporate participants also helped in the battle against HIV/AIDS by participating in the 4.5 km charity race. All the money collected from this race was donated to Project Concern International, an NGO working towards HIV/AIDS awareness and prevention in Pune.

The twenty-fifth edition of the event was held in 2010. The organizers introduced two new categories - Women's Full Marathon and Men's Half Marathon.

Since 1983, thousands of runners from all walks of life have taken part in the event. The Pune International Marathon is now widely used as a platform to spread social messages and raise funds for charitable causes. The Athletics Federation of India has awarded the status of 'National Marathon Championship' to the Pune International Marathon. The marathon route consists of Pune's scenic and historic locations with thousands of spectators lining up along the course to cheer the participants. It is the most anticipated running festival in the city of Pune.

== Race day photos ==
In the 33rd edition of the race held on 2 December 2018, participants could easily find their candid action photos directly on the basis of their names or Bib numbers. Pune International Marathon partnered with SplitSecondPix, a Technology company based out of Mumbai to enable this facility for the participants. This facility created lot of excitement amongst runners and welcomed the new introduction with cheer and joy.

== Race Types ==
No	Race Name	Distance (in kilometers)
1	Men's Full	42.195
2	Men's Half	21
3	Women's Half	21
4	Men's 10k	10
5	Women's 10k	10
6	World Peace Run	3.5
7	Wheelchair (Machine and Hand)	3.5
8	Boys [under 18]	3.5
9	Girls [under 18]	3.5
10	Boys [under 16]	3.5
11	Girls [under 16]	3.5
12	Boys [under 14]	3.5
13	Girls [under 14]	3.5

== Past winners ==
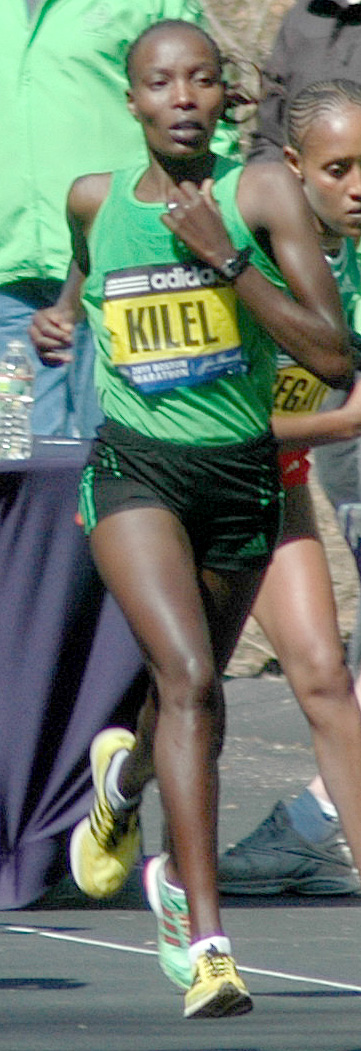
Kenyan Caroline Kilel won the 2008 women's half marathon race.

Key: Course record Half marathon distance Asian Marathon Championship race

Edition	Year	Men's winner	Time (h:m:s)	Women's winner	Time (h:m:s)
1st	1983	Tommy Persson (SWE)	2:24:15	—	—
2nd	1984	Steven Marwa (TAN)	2:33:59	—	—
3rd	1985	Savio d'Souza (IND)	2:35:11	Asha Agarwal (IND)	1:24:10
4th	1986	Savio d'Souza (IND)	2:31:28	Karolina Szabó (HUN)	1:17:09
5th	1987	François Blommaerts (BEL)	2:29:40	Suman Rawat (IND)	1:21:54
6th	1989	Yaswant Rawat Singh (IND)	2:31:47	Sunita Godhara (IND)	2:58:39
7th	1990	Shivkumar Yadav (IND)	2:27:56	Nanda Jadhav (IND)	1:17:42
8th	1991	Vithana Samarasinghe (SRI)	2:23:46	Nanda Jadhav (IND)	2:57:34
9th	1992	Shivkumar Yadav (IND)	2:26:34	Suman Mehta (IND)	2:51:01
10th	1993	Robert Nolan (AUS)	2:23:23	Vally Sathyabhama (IND)	2:47:46
11th	1994	Joshua Kipkemboi (KEN)	2:24:35	Midde Hamrin (SWE)	1:17:19
12th	1996	Joseph Kahugu (KEN)	2:13:00	Lukose Leelamma (IND)	?
13th	1997 (Jan)	Abhay Singh (IND)	2:23:08	Camilla Benjaminsson (SWE)	1:20:00
14th	1997 (Dec)	Mytahar Echchadi (MAR)	2:25:36	Zahra Akrachi (MAR)	1:16:42
15th	1999	Zablon Mokaya (KEN)	2:22:54	Lyubov Fyodorova (RUS)	1:29:49
16th	2000	Fedor Ryzhov (RUS)	2:25:17	Margaret Ngotho (KEN)	1:18:10
17th	2002	Ambrose Makau (KEN)	2:23:20	Natalya Volgina (RUS)	1:15:52
18th	2003	Robert Kipyego (KEN)	2:16:36	Masila Ndunge (KEN)	1:13:49
19th	2004	Douglas Gwandaru (KEN)	2:21:22	Jane Muia (KEN)	1:11:59
20th	2005	Josephat Ndeti (KEN)	2:19:35	Nailiya Yulamanova (RUS)	1:15:05
21st	2006	Said Regragui (SWE)	2:18:23	Hellen Musyoka (KEN)	1:13:20
22nd	2007	Philip Muia (KEN)	2:17:32	Roman Gebregessese (ETH)	1:11:30.4
23rd	2008	Nelson Rotich (KEN)	2:17:45	Caroline Kilel (KEN)	1:10:17
24th	2009	Augustine Sembri (KEN)	2:13:05	Agnes Mutune (KEN)	1:10:30
25th	2010	Gudeta Gemechu (ETH)	2:13:20	Birzah Tekele (ETH)	2:38:41
26th	2011	Teferi Regasa (ETH)	2:16:57	Pauline Thitu (KEN)	1:12:29
27th	2012	Luka Chelimo (KEN)	2:13:03	Pauline Kamulu (KEN)	1:08:37
28th	2013	Endale Abayneh (ETH)	2:17:52	Aberu Tesema (ETH)	1:16:54
29th	2014	Amos Maiyo (KEN)	2:18:31	Nancy Nzisa (KEN)	1:11:51
30th	2015	Belay Mamo (ETH)	2:17:35	Dorcas Kothome (KEN)	1:11:48
—	2016	Cancelled due to 2016 Indian banknote demonetisation, Postponed to 29 January 2017			
31st	2017 (Jan)	Hosea Rutto (ETH)	2:12:18	Gladys Tarus (KEN)	1:12:37
32nd	2017 (Dec)	Getachew Besha (ETH)	2:15:19	Tisasua Basazin (ETH)	1:15:31
33rd	2018	Atlawim Debebe (ETH)	2:17:17	Pascalia Jepkosgei (KEN)	2:50:27
34th	2019	Dadi Teka (ETH)	2:18:05	Belaynesh Shifera (ETH)	2:44:00
—	2020	did not held			
—	2021	did not held			
35th	2022 (Feb)	Kalidas Hirave (IND)	2:24:32	Jyoti Gawate (IND)	3:06:02
36th	2022 (Dec)	Leta Tesfaye Guteta (ETH)	02:17:27	Derartu Kebede (ETH)	02:47:02
37th	2023	Kemei Elias Kiprono (KEN)	03:11:04	Roba Bati Hailu (ETH)	02:24:15
38th	2024	Asefa Bizumeh Ayaleneh (ETH)	02:18:03	Nigatu Tisasua Basazin (ETH)	02:49:39
39th	2025	Dadi Solomon Teka (ETH)	02:18:05	Belaynesh Shifera (ETH)	02:44:00
