= Kim Hye-song (runner) =

North Korean long-distance runner (born 1993)

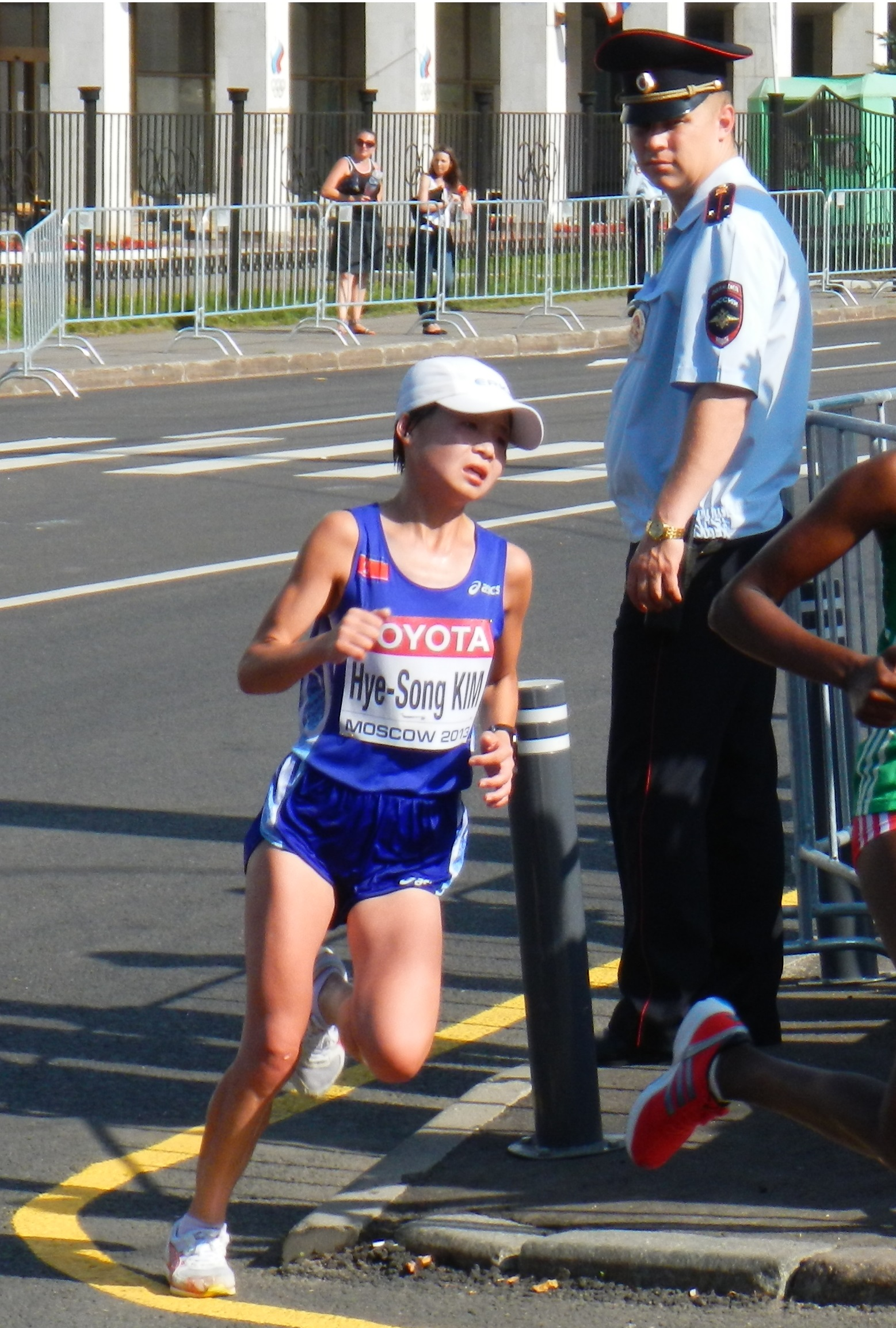
- Kim Hye-song at the 2013 World Championships in Athletics in Moscow, Russia

Personal information
- Born: 9 March 1993 (age 33) Sariwon, North Hwanghae Province, North Korea
- Height: 153 cm (5 ft 0 in)

Sport
- Country: North Korea
- Sport: Athletics
- Event: Marathon
- Team: Pyongyang Sports Team
- Coached by: Jong Myong-chol

Achievements and titles
- World finals: 2013: Marathon – 14th; 2015: Marathon – 9th
- Highest world ranking: 9th (marathon, 2015)
- Personal bests: 10,000 m: 33:59.20 (2012); Marathon: 2:27:58 (2014)

Korean name
- Hangul: 김혜성
- RR: Gim Hyeseong
- MR: Kim Hyesŏng
- Updated on 5 September 2015

Kim Hye-song (Korean: 김혜성; Korean pronunciation: [kim.ɦe.sʌŋ] or [kim] [he.sʌŋ]; born 9 March 1993) is a North Korean long-distance runner.

Marathoner Kim Hye-gyong is her sister. They are fraternal twins. Hye-song is the eldest of the two. According to their coach, Jong Myong-chol, Hye-song is more conservative and quiet than her sister. The coach considers their healthy rivalry in races and friendship a key to their success.

Kim represents the Pyongyang Sports Team. Together she and her sister train five times a week, running 25–30 km (16–19 mi) a day.

The sisters Kim, along with Kim Mi-gyong (no relation) are considered the most prominent of North Korean female marathoners today.

== Career ==
Kim is from Sariwon, North Hwanghae Province. She and her sister started running in middle-school at the age of 14. Their father was a marathon coach at that time. Kim trained at a sports school in Kumchon County. At the age of 14, she won both the 3,000 m and 5,000 m events at a national competition between sport schools. The sisters then moved to the capital Pyongyang. Kim finished fifth at the half marathon of the 2010 Pyongyang Marathon and was subsequently chosen to represent North Korea in the national team.

She could not join her sister in the 2015 Hong Kong Marathon serving as that year's Asian Marathon Championship due to a left hamstring injury. Kim took part in the women's marathon at the 2015 World Championships in Athletics in Beijing, China, finishing 9th.

== International competitions ==
Year	Competition	Venue	Position	Event	Notes
2013	Pyongyang Marathon	Pyongyang, North Korea	9th	Marathon	2:34:46
2013	World Championships	Moscow, Russia	14th	Marathon	2:38:28
2013	Great Eastern Women's Run	Singapore	2nd	Half-marathon	1:17:52
2014	Pyongyang Marathon	Pyongyang, North Korea	2nd	Marathon	2:27:58
2014	Asian Games	Incheon, South Korea	9th	Marathon	2:38:55
2015	Pyongyang Marathon	Pyongyang, North Korea	1st	Marathon	2:29:12
2015	World Championships	Beijing, China	9th	Marathon	2:30:59
