= Pak Song-chol (athlete) =

North Korean long-distance runner

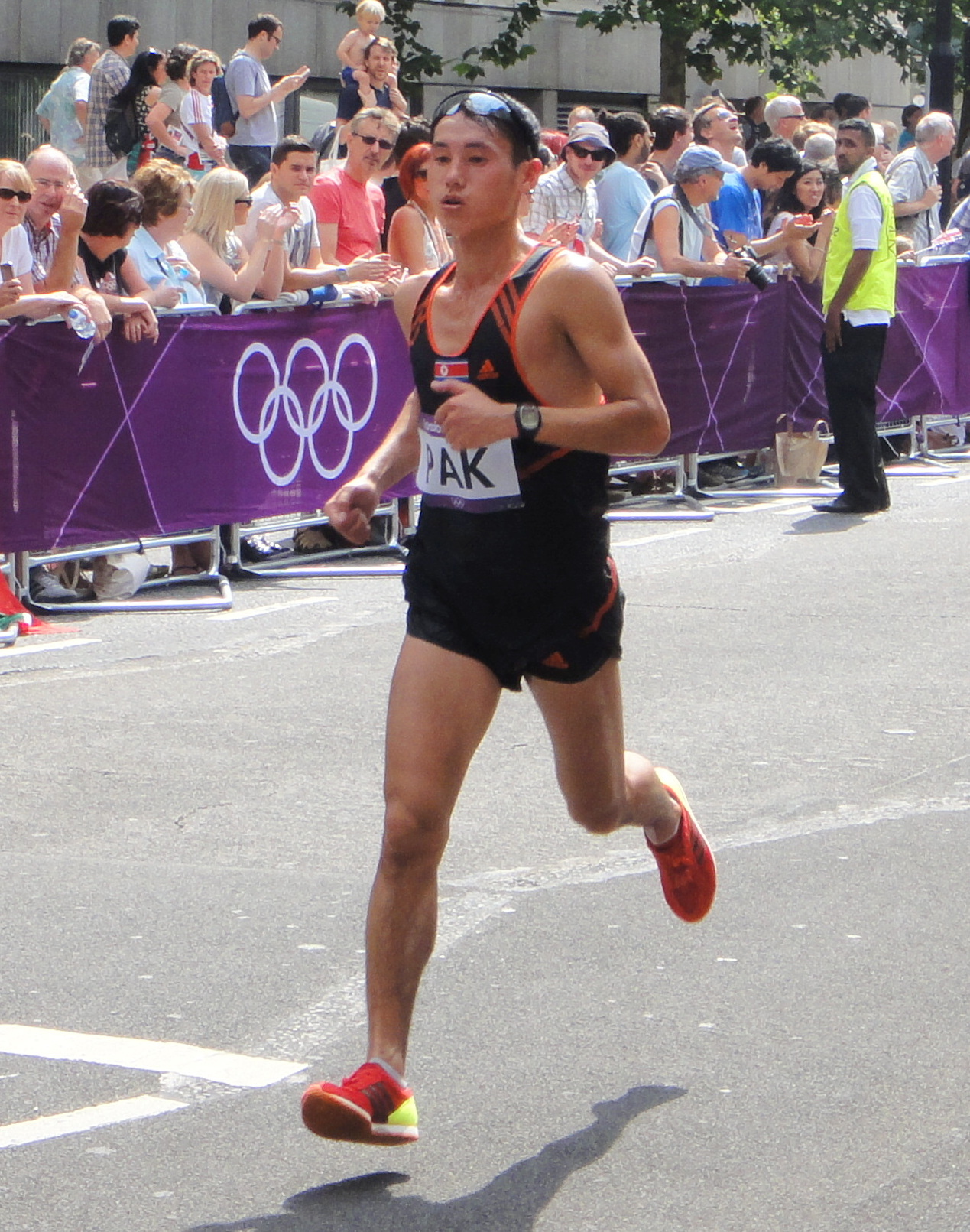
- Pak Song-chol in the marathon at the 2012 Summer Olympics in London

Personal information
- Born: November 10, 1984 (age 41)
- Height: 1.7 m (5 ft 7 in)
- Weight: 60 kg (130 lb)

Sport
- Country: North Korea
- Sport: Athletics
- Event: Marathon

Korean name
- Hangul: 박성철
- RR: Bak Seongcheol
- MR: Pak Sŏngch'ŏl
Medal record
Men's Track & Field
Representing North Korea
East Asian Games
| Silver medal – second place | 2009 Hong Kong | Half marathon |

Pak Song-chol (born 10 November 1984) is a North Korean long-distance runner who specializes in the marathon. His personal best time is 2:12:41 hours in 2007, winning the Pyongyang Marathon. He has represented North Korea at the Summer Olympics on two occasions (2008 and 2012) and the 2010 Asian Games. He won a silver medal at the 2009 East Asian Games, running in the half marathon.

== Career ==
Born in South Hwanghae Province, Pak's first marathon race came at the Pyongyang Marathon in 2005. After racing at the Xiamen and Macau Marathon races in 2006, he dipped under two hours and twenty minutes for the first time in 2007: he won the Pyongyang race in a personal best of 2:12:41 hours and also ran at the Beijing Marathon, timing 2:15:17 hours for eleventh place. He defended his Pyongyang title in 2008 and was selected to compete in the 2008 Olympic marathon, where he placed 40th overall.

Pak managed only sixth at the 2009 Pyongyang Marathon but he was entered into the men's marathon at the 2009 World Championships in Athletics and came 43rd with a time of 2:21:12. He won his first international medal at the East Asian Games that year, taking the half marathon silver. He had a strong run at the 2010 Pyongyang race, running 2:14:09 – his fastest time since 2007. However, he had to settle for second place behind surprise winner Ivan Babaryka. He ran at the 2010 Asian Games and was eighth in the marathon. In his sole outing of 2011, he represented North Korea at the 2011 World Military Games, finishing fifth.

The 2012 Pyongyang Marathon was held as part of celebrations for the 100 years since Kim Il Sung's birth and featured one of the race's closest ever finishes: Pak recorded the same time as Oleksandr Matviychuk (2:12:54 hours), but it was the Ukrainian who topped the podium. He was chosen to race at the Olympics for a second time and ended the 2012 Olympic men's marathon in 52nd place. He had his third fastest time of his career in Pyongyang in 2013, but managed only fourth place behind foreign opposition.

== Achievements ==
| Year | Competition | Venue | Position | Event | Notes |
|---|---|---|---|---|---|
| 2005 | Pyongyang Marathon | Pyongyang, North Korea | 18th | Marathon | 2:23:36 |
| 2006 | Xiamen International Marathon | Xiamen, China | 16th | Marathon | 2:20:40 |
| 2007 | Pyongyang Marathon | Pyongyang, North Korea | 1st | Marathon | 2:12:41 |
| 2007 | Beijing Marathon | Beijing, China | 11th | Marathon | 2:15:17 |
| 2008 | Xiamen International Marathon | Xiamen, China | 8th | Marathon | 2:15:34 |
| 2008 | Pyongyang Marathon | Pyongyang, North Korea | 1st | Marathon | 2:14:22 |
| 2008 | Olympics | Beijing, China | 40th | Marathon | 2:21:16 |
| 2009 | Pyongyang Marathon | Pyongyang, North Korea | 6th | Marathon | 2:15:53 |
| 2009 | World Championships | Berlin, Germany | 43rd | Marathon | 2:21:12 |
| 2009 | East Asian Games | Hong Kong | 2nd | Half marathon | 1:06:05 |
| 2010 | Pyongyang Marathon | Pyongyang, North Korea | 2nd | Marathon | 2:14:09 |
| 2010 | Asian Games | Guangzhou, China | 6th | Marathon | 2:18:16 |
| 2011 | Military World Games | Rio de Janeiro, Brazil | 5th | Marathon | 2:21:59 |
| 2012 | Pyongyang Marathon | Pyongyang, North Korea | 2nd | Marathon | 2:12:54 |
| 2012 | Olympics | London, United Kingdom | 52nd | Marathon | 2:20:20 |
| 2013 | Pyongyang Marathon | Pyongyang, North Korea | 4th | Marathon | 2:13:24 |
| 2014 | Pyongyang Marathon | Pyongyang, North Korea | 6th | Marathon | 2:15:01 |
