= Athletics at the 2007 Summer Universiade – Women's 10,000 metres =

The women's 10,000 metres event at the 2007 Summer Universiade was held on 9 August.

== Results ==
Rank	Name	Nationality	Time	Notes
1st place, gold medalist(s)	Kseniya Agafonova	Russia	32:20.94	
2nd place, silver medalist(s)	Ryoko Kizaki	Japan	32:55.11	PB
3rd place, bronze medalist(s)	Jo Bun-Hui	North Korea	33:20.55	
4	Kim Jong-Hyang	North Korea	33:55.86	
5	Seika Nishikawa	Japan	33:59.84	SB
6	Fatima Boufares	Morocco	34:32.68	SB
7	Song Xiaoxue	China	34:38.63	
8	Lucélia Peres	Brazil	34:57.45	
9	María Sánchez	Spain	35:19.20	
10	Ljiljana Ćulibrk	Croatia	36:39.60	
11	Wu Wan-ling	Chinese Taipei	37:17.58	
12	Kim Soo-young	South Korea	38:03.81	
13	Truong Thi Mai	Vietnam	38:23.21	
	Han Zhenying	China	DNF	
	Nguyen Thi Hoa	Vietnam	DNS	
