= Machi Tanaka =

Japanese long-distance runner

Machi Tanaka (田中真知, born July 21, 1983) is a female long-distance runner from Japan, who is best known for winning the half marathon at the 2003 Summer Universiade. She attended Meijo University.

== Achievements ==
Year	Competition	Venue	Position	Event	Notes
Representing Japan
2002	World Junior Championships	Kingston, Jamaica	5th	3000m	9:19.95
2003	Universiade	Daegu, South Korea	1st	Half marathon	1:13:06

== Personal bests ==
- 3000 metres - 9:17.54 min (2001)
- 5000 metres - 15:39.52 min (2004)
- 10,000 metres - 32:27.01 min (2003)
- Half marathon - 1:10:00 hrs (2004)
