= 2002 Asian Athletics Championships – Women's 10,000 metres =

The women's 10,000 metres event at the 2002 Asian Athletics Championships was held in Colombo, Sri Lanka on 10 August.

== Results ==
Rank	Name	Nationality	Time	Notes
1st place, gold medalist(s)	Ham Bong-Sil	North Korea	34:44.92	SB
2nd place, silver medalist(s)	Jo Bun-Hui	North Korea	35:00.63	SB
3rd place, bronze medalist(s)	Aruna Devi Waishram	India	35:38.70	
4	M.A. Chandrawathe	Sri Lanka	35:53.75	PB
5	Dalugoda Inoka	Sri Lanka	36:09.54	SB
6	Sujeewa Nilmini Jayasena	Sri Lanka	36:14.28	SB
7	Beant Kaur	India	36:43.76	
	Gulsara Dadabayeva	Tajikistan	DNF	
