= Athletics at the 2011 Summer Universiade – Women's half marathon =

The women's half marathon event at the 2011 Summer Universiade was held on 21 August.

== Medalists ==
=== Individual ===
Gold	Silver	Bronze
Ro Un-Ok; North Korea	Jin Lingling; China	Sayo Nomura; Japan

=== Team ===
Gold	Silver	Bronze
Japan; Sayo Nomura; Machiko Iwakawa; Aki Otagiri; Shiho Takechi	China; Jin Lingling; Jiang Xiaoli; Li Zhenzhu; Jin Yuan; Sun Juan	

== Results ==
Official Video

Rank	Name	Nationality	Time	Notes
1st place, gold medalist(s)	Ro Un-Ok	North Korea	1:16:38	
2nd place, silver medalist(s)	Jin Lingling	China	1:16:42	
3rd place, bronze medalist(s)	Sayo Nomura	Japan	1:16:48	
4	Machiko Iwakawa	Japan	1:16:53	
5	Aki Otagiri	Japan	1:17:02	
6	Jiang Xiaoli	China	1:17:57	PB
7	Shiho Takechi	Japan	1:18:16	
8	Li Zhenzhu	China	1:18:30	
9	Filomena Costa	Portugal	1:19:15	
10	Chang Eunyoung	South Korea	1:20:11	
11	Jin Yuan	China	1:20:28	
12	Clare Geraghty	Australia	1:20:52	
13	Slađana Perunović	Montenegro	1:22:16	
14	Cristina Frumuz	Romania	1:22:57	
15	Sun Juan	China	1:23:18	
16	Rim Yon-Hui	North Korea	1:23:31	
17	Volha Minina	Belarus	1:30:45	
18	Remeswari Manakkampad Velayudhan	India	1:31:23	
19	Grete Tonne	Estonia	1:32:31	
20	Stella Akidi	Uganda	1:37:49	
21	Nadima Mirzoeva	Tajikistan	1:50:35	
	Kim Hye Gyong	North Korea	DNF	
