= Athletics at the 2003 Summer Universiade – Women's half marathon =

The women's half marathon event at the 2003 Summer Universiade was held on 30 August in Daegu, South Korea.

== Results ==
Rank	Athlete	Nationality	Time	Notes
1st place, gold medalist(s)	Machi Tanaka	Japan	1:13:06	
2nd place, silver medalist(s)	Jo Bun-Hui	North Korea	1:13:47	
3rd place, bronze medalist(s)	Jang Son-Ok	North Korea	1:13:55	
4	Nozomi Iijima	Japan	1:15:18	
5	Anna Incerti	Italy	1:15:37	
6	Yi Miaomiao	China	1:16:05	
7	Madoka Omoda	Japan	1:16:05	
8	Pyo Un-Suk	North Korea	1:16:57	
9	Lucélia Peres	Brazil	1:17:33	
10	Hong Ok-Dan	North Korea	1:20:03	
11	Kim Ji-Eun	South Korea	1:22:51	
12	Maja Neuenschwander	Switzerland	1:23:26	
13	Elizabeth Stryoom	South Africa	1:25:15	
14	Luz Silva	Chile	1:27:46	
15	Diana Chelimo	Uganda	1:39:28	
	Kim Chang-Ok	North Korea	DNF	
	Lisa Blommé	Sweden	DNF	
	Alisha Awal	Nepal	DNF	
