= Athletics at the 2007 Summer Universiade – Women's half marathon =

The women's half marathon event at the 2007 Summer Universiade was held on 11 August.

== Results ==
Rank	Name	Nationality	Time	Notes
1st place, gold medalist(s)	Kim Kum-ok	North Korea	1:12:31	
2nd place, silver medalist(s)	Kei Terada	Japan	1:12:37	
3rd place, bronze medalist(s)	Jong Yong-ok	North Korea	1:13:56	
4	Jo Pun-Hui	North Korea	1:14:37	
5	Helalia Johannes	Namibia	1:16:55	
6	Lucélia Peres	Brazil	1:17:53	
7	Fatima Boufares	Morocco	1:18:03	
8	Yoshie Kurisu	Japan	1:18:10	
9	Anastasiya Padalinskaya	Belarus	1:20:22	
10	Beata Naigambo	Namibia	1:21:09	
11	Mariko Suzuki	Japan	1:22:50	
12	Petra Teveli	Hungary	1:22:56	
13	Han Zhenying	China	1:23:17	
14	Kim Ok-bin	South Korea	1:24:02	
15	Pacharee Chaitongsri	Thailand	1:25:20	
16	Wang Yanling	China	1:30:50	
17	Ketmanee Senaphan	Thailand	1:36:31	
18	Haridevi Rajlawat Khatri	Nepal	1:39:14	
