= Eduardus Nabunome =

Indonesian athlete (1968–2020)

Personal information
- Full name: Anderias Hiler Eduardus Nabunome
- Nationality: Indonesian
- Born: 12 April 1968 South Central Timor, Indonesia
- Died: 12 October 2020 (aged 52) Jakarta, Indonesia

Sport
- Sport: Long-distance running
- Event: 5000 metres
Medal record
Men's athletics
Representing Indonesia
Asian Marathon Championships
Gold medal – first place	1992 Bandung	Marathon
Silver medal – second place	1994 Oita–Nagoya	Marathon
Southeast Asian Games
Gold medal – first place	1987 Jakarta	5,000 m
Gold medal – first place	1987 Jakarta	10,000 m
Gold medal – first place	1989 Kuala Lumpur	5,000 m
Gold medal – first place	1989 Kuala Lumpur	10,000 m
Gold medal – first place	1991 Manila	10,000 m
Gold medal – first place	1997 Jakarta	Marathon

Anderias Hiler Eduardus Nabunome (12 April 1968 – 12 October 2020) was an Indonesian long-distance runner. He competed in the men's 5000 metres and the 10,000 metres at the 1988 Summer Olympics. He won 1992 Asian Marathon Championships in Bandung.

After his retirement as an athlete, he ran his own athletic club, and became a trainer for the Indonesian Athletics Federation in Jakarta. He died on 12 October 2020 in Jakarta while being treated for a heart disease.
