= Ri Kyong-chol =

North Korean distance runner

- Hangul: 리경철
- RR: Ri Gyeongcheol
- MR: Ri Kyŏngch'ŏl

Ri Kyong-chol (born 8 March 1979) is a North Korean long-distance runner who specializes in the marathon. His personal best time is 2:11:36 hours, achieved at the 2005 Pyongyang Marathon.

He finished 32nd at the 2005 World Championships. He also finished fourteenth in the half marathon at the 2003 Summer Universiade, ninth at the 2006 Asian Games and won the 2005 and 2006 Pyongyang Marathon.

== Achievements ==
Year	Competition	Venue	Position	Event	Notes
Representing North Korea
2003	Universiade	Daegu, South Korea	14th	Half marathon	1:07:05
2005	Pyongyang Marathon	Pyongyang, North Korea	1st	Marathon	2:11:36
2006	Pyongyang Marathon	Pyongyang, North Korea	1st	Marathon	2:13:15
