= Choe Chang-sop =

North Korean long-distance runner

Chang Sop-choe
Personal information
- Nationality: North Korean
- Born: 최창섭, Choe Chang-seop; 18 July 1955 (age 70)

Sport
- Sport: Long-distance running
- Event: Marathon

Chang Sop-choe (born 18 July 1955) is a North Korean former long-distance runner. He competed in the marathon at the 1976 Summer Olympics and the 1980 Summer Olympics.

Chang won the 1975 Košice Peace Marathon with a record time. His win signified the beginning of marathon running in earnest in North Korea. He became the greatest North Korean athlete of his time, and received the title of Merited Athlete. The popular film Run, Korea! depicts his life.

Mun Gyong-ae, a female marathoner who brought marathon back to the forefront after a decline in the 1980s, has been compared to Chang.
