= Gulzhanat Zhanatbek =

Kazakhstani long-distance runner

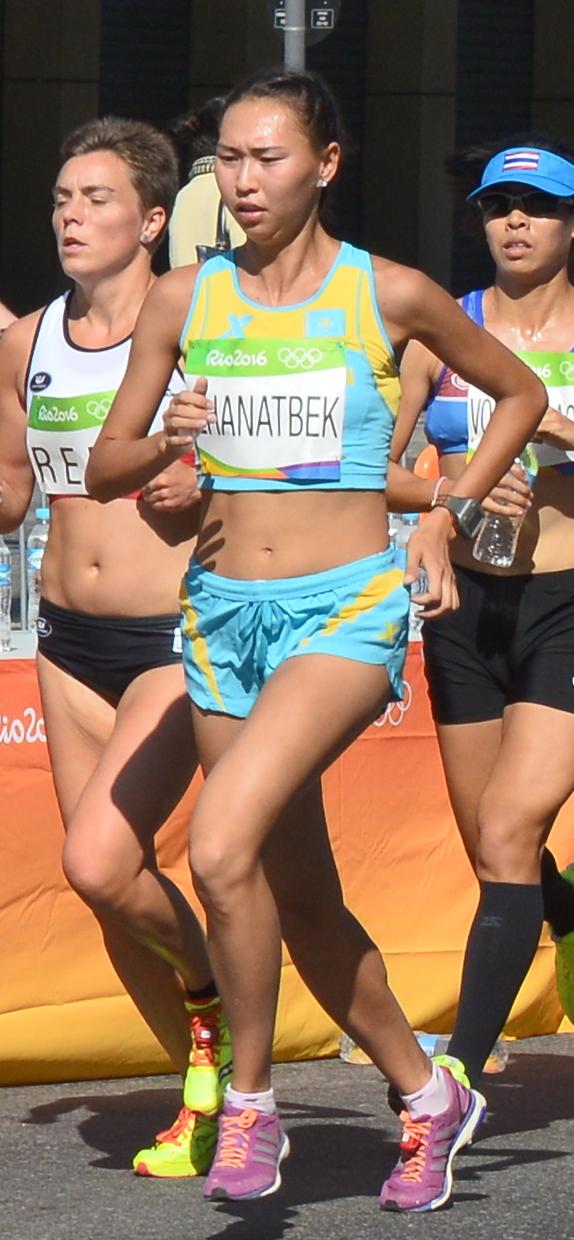
- Zhanatbek at the 2016 Olympics

Personal information
- Born: 30 November 1991 (age 34) Taldykorgan, Kazakh SSR, Soviet Union
- Education: Zhetysu State University
- Height: 170 cm (5 ft 7 in)
- Weight: 55 kg (121 lb)

Sport
- Country: Kazakhstan
- Sport: Track and field
- Event: Marathon
- Coached by: Vyacheslav Sokirko

Achievements and titles
- Personal best: 2:38:36 (2015)
- Updated on 2 September 2015

Gulzhanat Zhanatbek (born 30 November 1991) is a female Kazakhstani long-distance runner. She competed in the marathon event at the 2015 World Championships in Athletics and 2016 Olympics, and placed third at the 2015 Asian Marathon Championships.
