= Athletics at the 2003 Summer Universiade – Men's half marathon =

The men's half marathon event at the 2003 Summer Universiade was held on 30 August in Daegu, South Korea.

The winning margin was an impressive 63 seconds which as of 2024 remains the only time the men's half marathon was won by more than 20 seconds at these games.

== Results ==
Rank	Athlete	Nationality	Time	Notes
1st place, gold medalist(s)	Abdellah Bay	Morocco	1:04:21	
2nd place, silver medalist(s)	Francis Yiga	Uganda	1:05:24	
3rd place, bronze medalist(s)	Iván Sánchez	Spain	1:05:29	
4	Yoshihiro Murata	Japan	1:05:32	
5	Park Ju-young	South Korea	1:05:33	
6	Brahim Chettah	Algeria	1:05:39	
7	Jong Myong-Chol	North Korea	1:05:46	
8	Jonathan Monje	Chile	1:06:00	
9	Koichi Mitsuyuki	Japan	1:06:02	
10	Akira Hata	Japan	1:06:25	
11	Jonnatan Morales	Mexico	1:06:36	
12	Lee Du-haeng	South Korea	1:07:04	
13	Wu Wen-chien	Chinese Taipei	1:07:04	
14	Ri Kyong-Chol	North Korea	1:07:05	
15	Wilson Busienei	Uganda	1:07:24	
16	Suliman Al-Ghodran	Jordan	1:07:27	
17	Shota Nakai	Japan	1:07:29	
18	Song Byong-Ho	North Korea	1:07:44	
19	Gil Jae-Son	North Korea	1:08:14	
20	Petrus Jacobs	South Africa	1:08:39	
21	Slimane Bedda	Algeria	1:08:40	
22	Donatien Buzingo	Burundi	1:08:53	
23	Petrus Seeco	South Africa	1:09:05	
24	Pak Bong-Nam	North Korea	1:09:21	
25	Aleksey Veselov	Russia	1:09:30	
26	Joseph Nsubuga	Uganda	1:10:30	
27	Kim Je-kyung	South Korea	1:10:43	
28	Lee Yeon-rak	South Korea	1:11:15	
29	Chang Chia-Che	Chinese Taipei	1:13:06	
30	Hong Jung-woo	South Korea	1:13:41	
31	Foufaka Henry	Solomon Islands	1:15:02	
32	Tshering Lama	Nepal	1:15:14	
33	Que Yin Tik	Hong Kong	1:16:24	
34	Ashley Scheepers	South Africa	1:25:42	
35	José Augusto Acierno	Mexico	1:25:43	
36	Alin Soares	Timor-Leste	1:29:50	
	Abdelmouttalib Ouadrhiri	Morocco	DNF	
	Omar Abdi Hamid Hassan	Somalia	DNS	
