= Kim Hye-gyong =

North Korean long-distance runner (born 1993)

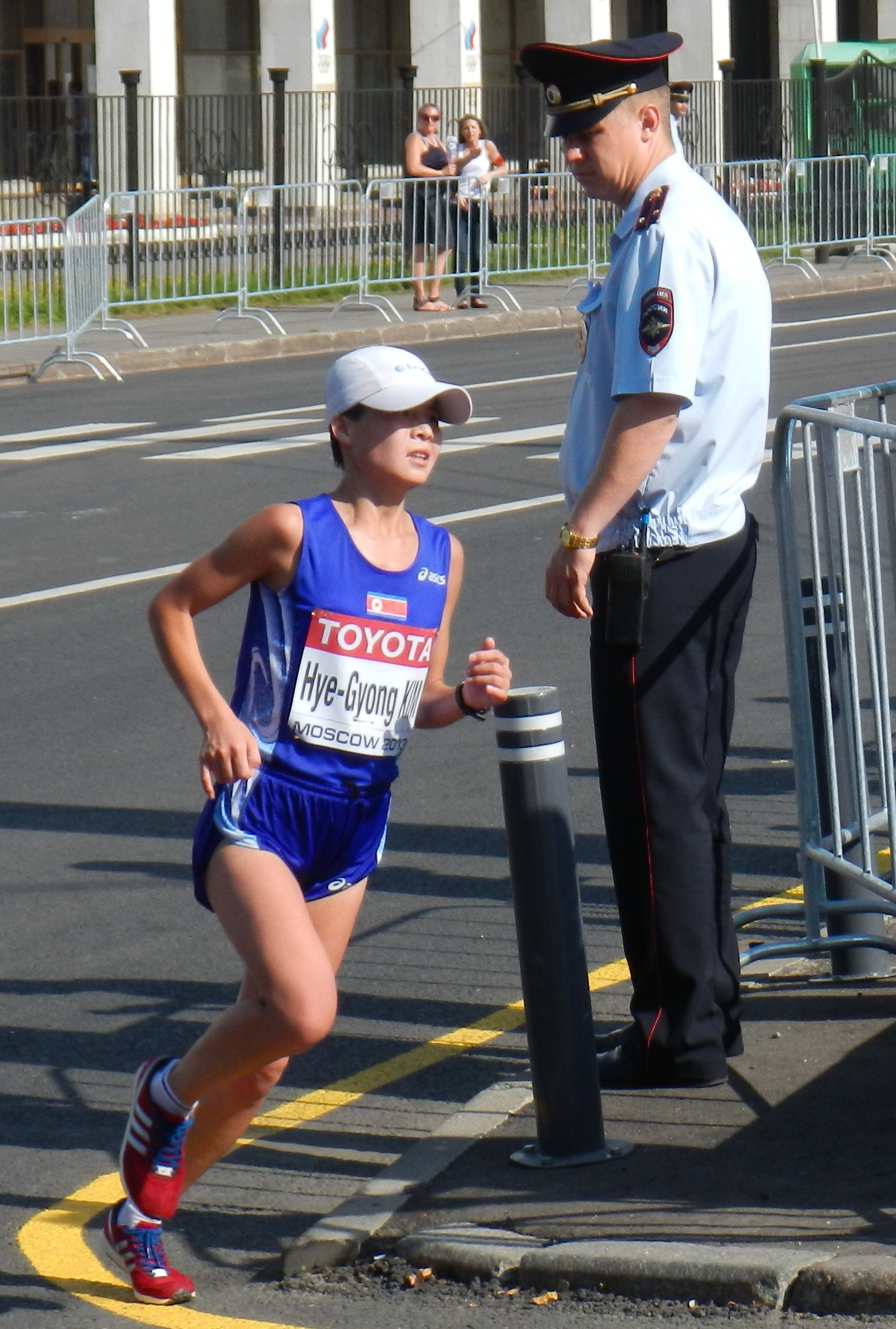
- Kim Hye-gyong at the 2013 World Championships in Athletics in Moscow, Russia

Personal information
- Born: 9 March 1993 (age 33) Sariwon, North Hwanghae Province, North Korea
- Height: 153 cm (5 ft 0 in)

Korean name
- Hangul: 김혜경
- RR: Gim Hyegyeong
- MR: Kim Hyegyŏng

Sport
- Country: North Korea
- Sport: Athletics
- Event: Marathon
- Team: Pyongyang Sports Team
- Coached by: Jong Myong-chol

Achievements and titles
- World finals: 2013: Marathon – 8th
- Highest world ranking: 8th (marathon, 2013)
- Personal best: Marathon: 2:28:32
Medal record
| Gold medal – first place | 2015 Hong Kong | Marathon |
- Updated on 5 September 2015

Kim Hye-gyong (Korean: 김혜경; Korean pronunciation: [kim.ɦe.ɡjʌŋ] or [kim] [he.ɡjʌŋ]; born 9 March 1993) is a North Korean long-distance runner.

Marathoner Kim Hye-song is her sister. They are fraternal twins. Hye-gyong is the younger. Their mutual coach, Jong Myong-chol, describes their healthy rivalry in races and friendship as the key to their success. According to Jong, Hye-gyong has a livelier personality of the twins and trains harder. Together they train five times a week, running 25–30 km (16–19 mi) a day.

The sisters Kim, along with Kim Mi-gyong (no relation) are considered the most prominent of North Korean female marathoners today. Kim Hye-gyong represents the Pyongyang Sports Team. She has a brother, a marathoner representing the April 25 Sports Team.

== Career ==
Kim is from Sariwon, North Hwanghae Province. Already physically active in kindergarten, she and her sister started running in middle-school at the age of 14. They were proven good runners and Kim won many competitions. Kim's ability to maintain high speed and good composure in particular made her stand out. The sisters' father was a marathon coach at that time. Kim trained at Kumchon County Juvenile Sports School. The sisters then moved to the capital Pyongyang. Kim subsequently won events such as 5,000 m, 10,000 m and 30 km in domestic tournaments like the 2009 Jonsung Cup and the 2011 national championships.

After having won the half marathon at the 2010 Pyongyang Marathon, she was selected to represent North Korea as a part of the national team. She went on to win the 2011 half marathon and coming second at the 2012 full marathon in Pyongyang, too. These results earned North Korea a berth to the 2012 London Olympics. However, Kim was not among those who raced there.

Kim's standing of 8th at the 2013 World Championships in Athletics brought her fame in her just second ever race abroad.

Kim then took a surprise victory over many East African favorites at the 2015 Hong Kong Marathon serving as that year's Asian Marathon Championship, taking home a $65,000 prize. Sports journalist Pat Butcher considered the victory an important step toward the 2015 World Championships in Athletics, saying: "This is a huge win for North Korea. The last time a woman from North Korea won the world championships was in 1999 in Seville. Maybe this could be Kim's year". (Note: The last and only time North Korea has won a medal at the World Championships in Athletics was Jong Song-ok's women's marathon gold at the 1999 World Championships in Seville, Spain.) Kim started in the women's marathon at the 2015 World Championships in Athletics in Beijing, China, but did not finish the race.

== Achievements ==
| Year | Competition | Venue | Position | Event | Notes |
|---|---|---|---|---|---|
| 2011 | 2011 Summer Universiade | Shenzhen, China | — | Half marathon | DNF |
| 2012 | Pyongyang Marathon | Pyongyang, North Korea | 2nd | Marathon | 2:31:29 |
| 2013 | Pyongyang Marathon | Pyongyang, North Korea | 2nd | Marathon | 2:28:32 |
| 2013 | 2013 World Championships in Athletics | Moscow, Russia | 8th | Marathon | 2:35:49 |
| 2013 | Great Eastern Women's Run | Singapore | 1st | Half marathon | 1:15:59 |
| 2014 | Pyongyang Marathon | Pyongyang, North Korea | 1st | Marathon | 2:27:05 |
| 2014 | 2014 Asian Games | Incheon, South Korea | 7th | Marathon | 2:36:38 |
| 2015 | 15th Asian Marathon Championship | Hong Kong | 1st | Marathon | 2:31:46 |
| 2015 | 2015 World Championships in Athletics | Beijing, China | — | Marathon | DNF |
