= Jo Bun-hui =

North Korean long-distance runner

- Hangul: 조분희
- RR: Jo Bunhui
- MR: Cho Punhŭi

Jo Bun-hui
Medal record

Women's athletics

Representing North Korea

Asian Championships
Silver medal – second place	2002 Colombo	10,000 m

Jo Bun-hui (born 29 November 1979) is a North Korean long-distance runner who specializes in the marathon. Her personal best time is 2:27:22 hours, achieved at the 2006 Pyongyang Marathon.

She competed at the 2004 and 2008 Olympic Games. She also won the silver medals in the 10,000 metres at the 2002 Asian Championships and the half marathon at the 2003 Summer Universiade, as well as the bronze medal in the 10,000 metres at the 2007 Summer Universiade. She finished fourth at the 2006 Asian Games and won the 2006 Pyongyang Marathon.

== Achievements ==
Year	Competition	Venue	Position	Event	Notes
Representing North Korea
2001	Pyongyang Marathon	Pyongyang, North Korea	3rd	Marathon	2:30:46
2002	Asian Championships	Colombo, Sri Lanka	4th	5000 m	16:41.43
2002	Asian Championships	Colombo, Sri Lanka	2nd	10,000 m	35:00.63
2003	Universiade	Daegu, South Korea	2nd	Half marathon	1:13:47
2004	Olympic Games	Athens, Greece	56th	Marathon	2:55:54
2006	Pyongyang Marathon	Pyongyang, North Korea	1st	Marathon	2:27:22
2007	Universiade	Bangkok, Thailand	3rd	10,000 m	33:20.55
2007	Universiade	Bangkok, Thailand	4th	Half marathon	1:14:37
2008	Olympic Games	Beijing, China	48th	Marathon	2:37:04
