= Ivan Babaryka =

Ukrainian long-distance runner

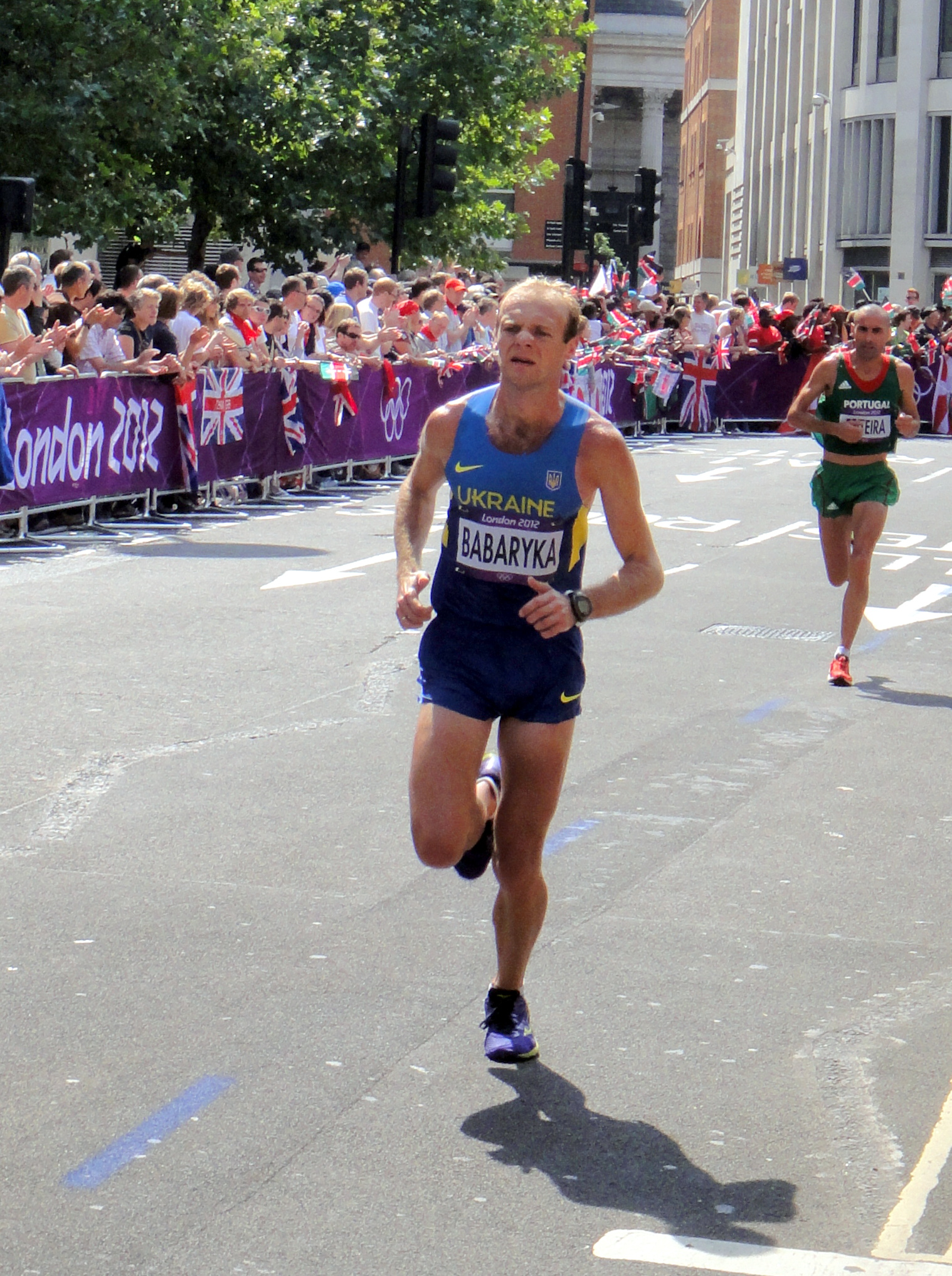
- Babaryka in the marathon at the 2012 Olympics in London

Personal information
- Born: 11 November 1982 (age 43)
- Height: 1.8 m (5 ft 11 in)
- Weight: 69 kg (152 lb)

Sport
- Country: Ukraine
- Sport: Athletics
- Event: Marathon

Ivan Babaryka (Ukrainian: Іван Бабарика; born 11 November 1982) is a Ukrainian long-distance runner who specialises in the marathon.

== Career ==
He began his career as a track athlete and became the Ukrainian indoor champion over 3000 metres in 2006. He won the 2007 Moscow International Peace Marathon, running a time of 2:20:34 in severe weather conditions. He finished in second place with a time of 2:14:55 at the 2008 Mainz Marathon, behind compatriot Andriy Naumov. He returned to Moscow in September and defended his marathon title with a time of 2:20:11. The following year, he was again runner up at the Mainz Marathon, this time to Sammy Kipkoech Tum, recording a season's best time of 2:15:36. He finished fifth at the Albstädter Citylauf with a time of 30:06, but he was the fastest European runner outside of the all-Kenyan top four.

He started 2010 with a win in the Championship of Ukraine of the Ministry of Internal Affairs 5K cross country race. He was a surprise winner of the Pyongyang Marathon in April that year, knocking nearly a minute of his previous marathon best with 2:13:56 to take victory over more favoured opposition.

== Road race wins ==
- Moscow International Peace Marathon: 2007, 2008
- Pyongyang Marathon: 2010

== Personal bests ==
Event	Time (h:m:s)	Venue	Date
10,000 metres	28:57.1	Kyiv, Ukraine	15 June 2006
Marathon	2:11:48	Barcelona, Spain	25 March 2012

- All information taken from IAAF profile.
