= Pascaline Wangui =

Kenyan long-distance runner

Pascaline Wangūi Bethuel (born 30 November 1960 in Nakuru, Rift Valley) is a retired female long-distance runner from Kenya, who twice (1988 and 1992) competed for her native country at the Summer Olympics in the women's marathon. She set her personal best (2:37:23) in the classic distance on 20 January 1991, finishing fourth in the Houston Marathon.

== Achievements ==
Year	Competition	Venue	Position	Event	Notes
Representing Kenya
1988	Olympic Games	Seoul, South Korea	49th	Marathon	2:47:42
1989	Rome City Marathon	Rome, Italy	1st	Marathon	2:46:28
1991	Houston Marathon	Houston, United States	4th	Marathon	2:37:23
1991	World Championships	Tokyo, Japan	18th	Marathon	2:45:22
1992	Vienna City Marathon	Vienna, Austria	1st	Marathon	2:40:50
1992	Olympic Games	Barcelona, Spain	28th	Marathon	2:56:46
