= Elena Murgoci =

Romanian long-distance runner

Personal information
- Nationality: Romanian
- Born: May 20, 1960 Vaslui, Romania
- Died: August 26, 1999 (age 26) Târgoviște, Romania

Sport
- Sport: Long-distance running
- Event: Marathon
Medal record
Women's athletics
Representing Romania
Pyongyang Marathon
Gold medal – first place	1986 Pyongyang Marathon	Marathon
Amsterdam Marathon
Gold medal – first place	1988 Amsterdam Marathon	Marathon
Rotterdam Marathon
Gold medal – first place	1989 Rotterdam Marathon	Marathon

Elena Murgoci-Florea (20 May 1960 – 26 August 1999) was a female long-distance runner from Romania, who specialized in the marathon race.

Murgoci represented her native country at the 1992 Summer Olympics, finishing in 32nd place in the women's marathon race. She is best known for winning the Amsterdam Marathon (1988) and the Rotterdam Marathon (1989). In 1996, she was disqualified for life by Romanian Athletics Federation for doping. She died aged 39 in Târgoviște as a result of being stabbed outside her home by a jealous boyfriend.

== Achievements ==
Year	Competition	Venue	Position	Event	Notes
Representing Romania
1986	Pyongyang Marathon	Pyongyang, North Korea	1st	Marathon	2:37:11
1988	Amsterdam Marathon	Amsterdam, Netherlands	1st	Marathon	2:41:56
1989	Rotterdam Marathon	Rotterdam, Netherlands	1st	Marathon	2:32:03
1992	Olympic Games	Barcelona, Spain	32nd	Marathon	3:01:46
