= Phyo Un-suk =

North Korean distance runner

- Hangul: 표은숙
- RR: Pyo Eunsuk
- MR: P'yo Ŭnsuk

Phyo Un-suk (born 13 June 1981) is a North Korean long-distance runner who specializes in the marathon. Her personal best time is 2:28:34 hours, achieved at the 2009 Pyongyang Marathon.

She finished eighth in the half marathon at the 2003 Summer Universiade, and won the 2008 and 2009 Pyongyang Marathon.

== Achievements ==
Year	Competition	Venue	Position	Event	Notes
Representing North Korea
2003	Universiade	Daegu, South Korea	8th	Half marathon	1:16:57
2008	Pyongyang Marathon	Pyongyang, North Korea	1st	Marathon	2:28:39
2009	Pyongyang Marathon	Pyongyang, North Korea	1st	Marathon	2:28:34
