= Pak Chol =

North Korean long-distance runner

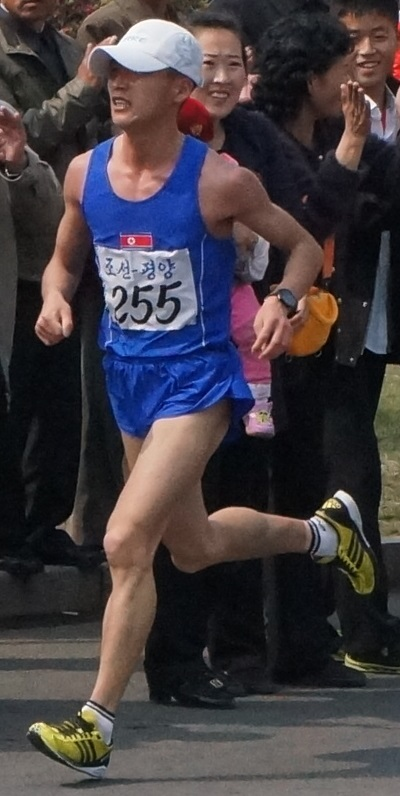
- Pak Chol at the 2014 Pyongyang Marathon

Personal information
- Born: 8 November 1990 (age 35)

Sport
- Country: North Korea
- Sport: Athletics
- Event: Marathon
- Team: Sajabong Sports Team

Achievements and titles
- World finals: 2015: Marathon – 11th
- Highest world ranking: 11th (marathon, 2015)
- Personal best: Marathon: 2:12:26

Korean name
- Hangul: 박철
- RR: Bak Cheol
- MR: Pak Ch'ŏl
- IPA: pak̚.tsʰʌl
- Updated on 27 August 2015

Pak Chol (Korean: 박철; Korean pronunciation: [pak̚.tsʰʌl]; born 8 November 1990) is a North Korean long-distance runner. He represents the Sajabong Sports Team.

Pak won the Pyongyang Marathon on 13 April 2014 with a personal best of 2:12:26. The winning time was an improvement of more than a minute from his previous personal best which earned him the fifth place in the same race in 2013. In 2015, he came second in the 15th Asian Marathon Championship in Hong Kong with a season's best of 2:16:09. He took part in the marathon at the 2015 World Championships in Beijing the same year and placed 11th with a time of 2:15:44, a new season's best.

In 2016 Pak Chol won the Pyongyang Mangyongdae Marathon in a time of 2:14:11. He then went on to represent his country in the men's marathon at the 2016 Rio de Janeiro Olympic Games. Pak Chol placed 27th in 2:15:27; the race was won by Kenya's Eliud Kipchoge in 2:08:44.

In 2017 Pak successfully defended his title, winning the Pyongyang Mangyongdae Prize Marathon in 2:14:56. In November Pak Chol competed in the Asian Marathon Championships in Dongguan, China. He finished 4th in a time of 2:16:19.

In 2018 Pak Chol represented his country at the 2018 Asian Games in Jakarta, Indonesia in the men's marathon. He finished 10th in 2:36:22.

== Achievements ==
Year	Competition	Venue	Position	Event	Notes
2013	Pyongyang Marathon	Pyongyang, North Korea	5th	Marathon	2:13:49
2014	Pyongyang Marathon	Pyongyang, North Korea	1st	Marathon	2:12:26
2015	Asian Marathon Championship	Hong Kong	2nd	Marathon	2:16:09
2015	World Championships	Beijing, China	11th	Marathon	2:15:44
2016	Pyongyang Marathon	Pyongyang, North Korea	1st	Marathon	2:14:10
2017	Pyongyang Marathon	Pyongyang, North Korea	1st	Marathon	2:14:56
2018	Asian Games	Jakarta, Indonesia	10th	Marathon	2:29:07
