= Daichi Kamino =

Japanese long-distance runner

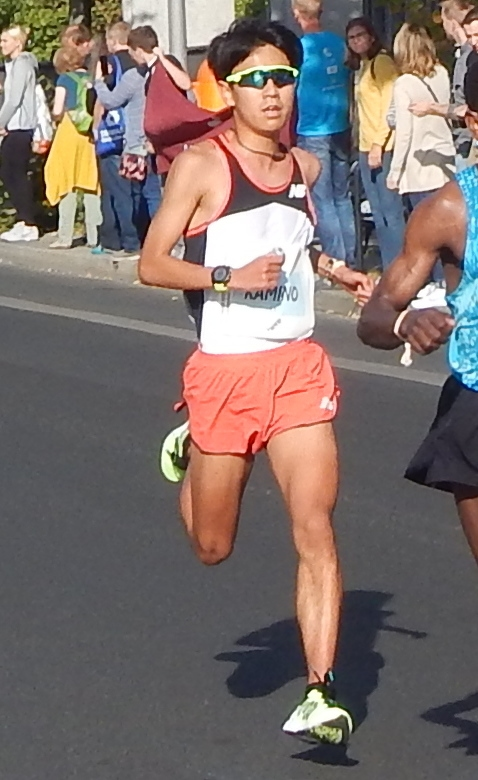

Personal information
- Native name: 神野大地

Sport
- Country: Japan
- Sport: Long-distance running

Daichi Kamino (Japanese: 神野大地) is a Japanese long-distance runner. In 2019, he won the Asian Marathon Championships held in Dongguan, China.

He also competed at the 2018 Tokyo Marathon and 2019 Tokyo Marathon.
