= Mun Gyong-ae =

North Korean long-distance runner

Personal information
- Nationality: North Korean
- Born: 8 April 1969 (age 57)

Sport
- Sport: Long-distance running
- Event: Marathon
Medal record
Women's athletics
Representing North Korea
Asian Championships
Silver medal – second place	1989 New Delhi	10,000 m

Mun Gyong-ae (Korean: 문경애, born 8 April 1969) is a North Korean long-distance runner. She competed in the women's marathon at the 1992 Summer Olympics.

She has been compared to Choe Chang-sop, a male marathoner whose 1975 win at the Košice Peace Marathon marked the beginning of marathon running in North Korea in earnest. Mun had brought marathon back to the forefront in the country after a period of decline during the 1980s. Mun was awarded the title of Merited Athlete for her feats.
