= Ri Kwang-ok =

North Korean long-distance runner

Personal information
- Nationality: North Korean
- Born: 리광옥; 27 July 1996 (age 29)

Sport
- Sport: Athletics
- Event: Marathon

Ri Kwang-ok (born 27 July 1996) is a North Korean athlete. She competed in the women's marathon event at the 2019 World Athletics Championships.
