= Vally Sathyabhama =

Long-distance runner

Vally Sathyabhama (born 14 May 1964) is a former Indian long-distance runner who currently holds the Indian national record in the marathon. She set the record with a time of 2:38:10 on 21 December 1995 in Chennai.

In 1991, she won the gold medal for 10,000 metres in the All-India Open National Championships. In the same year, she repeated her performance by winning the gold in 10,000 m in the All-India Inter-State Championships
