= Jong Myong-chol =

North Korean runner (born 1978)

- Hangul: 정명철
- RR: Jeong Myeongcheol
- MR: Chŏng Myŏngch'ŏl

Jong Myong-chol (born 11 March 1978) is a North Korean long-distance runner who specializes in the marathon. His personal best time is 2:14:58 hours, achieved at the 2005 Pyongyang Marathon.

He competed in the 2004 Olympic marathon. He also finished seventh in the half marathon at the 2003 Summer Universiade, and won the 2003 Pyongyang Marathon.

== Achievements ==
Year	Competition	Venue	Position	Event	Notes
Representing North Korea
2003	Pyongyang Marathon	Pyongyang, North Korea	1st	Marathon	2:15:05
2003	Universiade	Daegu, South Korea	7th	Half marathon	1:05:46
2004	Olympic Games	Athens, Greece	35th	Marathon	2:19:47
