= Jong Yong-ok =

North Korean long-distance runner (born 1981)

Personal information
- Nationality: North Korean
- Born: 24 January 1981 (age 45)
- Height: 156 cm (5 ft 1 in)
- Weight: 44 kg (97 lb)

Sport

Korean name
- Hangul: 정영옥
- RR: Jeong Yeongok
- MR: Chŏng Yŏngok
Medal record
Women's athletics
Representing North Korea
Universiade
Bronze medal – third place	2007 Bangkok	Half marathon

Jong Yong-ok (born 24 January 1981) is a North Korean long-distance runner who specializes in the marathon.

She finished 20th at the 2000 Olympic Games, 21st at the 2004 Olympic Games, 14th at the 2005 World Championships and 36th at the 2008 Olympic Games. She also finished sixth at the 2006 Asian Games, won the 2001 and 2007 Pyongyang Marathons and won the bronze medal (in half marathon) at the 2007 Summer Universiade.

Her personal best time is 2:26:02 hours, achieved at the 2007 Pyongyang Marathon. This is also the meet record.

== Achievements ==
Year	Competition	Venue	Position	Event	Notes
Representing North Korea
2000	Olympic Games	Sydney, Australia	20th	Marathon	2:31:40
2001	Pyongyang Marathon	Pyongyang, North Korea	1st	Marathon	2:28:32
2001	Beijing Marathon	Beijing, PR China	9th	Marathon	2:28:17
2003	World Championships	Paris, France	56th	Marathon	2:50:21
2004	Olympic Games	Athens, Greece	21st	Marathon	2:37:52
2005	World Championships	Helsinki, Finland	14th	Marathon	2:29:43
2005	East Asian Games	Macau	3rd	Half marathon	1:18:48
2006	Asian Games	Doha, Qatar	6th	Marathon	2:48:49
2007	Pyongyang Marathon	Pyongyang, North Korea	1st	Marathon	2:26:02
2007	Universiade	Bangkok, Thailand	3rd	Half marathon	1:13:56
2008	Olympic Games	Beijing, PR China	36th	Marathon	2:34:52
2009	World Championships	Berlin, Germany	33rd	Marathon	2:38:29
