= 1993 in the sport of athletics =

1993 in athletics
- Major world events: World Championships; World Indoor Championships
- IAAF Athletes of the Year: Colin Jackson; Sally Gunnell

This article contains an overview of the year 1993 in athletics.

== International events ==
- African Championships
- Asian Championships
- Bolivarian Games
- Central American and Caribbean Games
- Central American Championships
- East Asian Games
- Maccabiah Games
- Mediterranean Games
- Chinese National Games
- South American Championships
- South Asian Games
- Southeast Asian Games
- World Championships
- World Cross Country Championships
- World Half Marathon Championships
- World Indoor Championships
- World Race Walking Cup
- World Student Games

== World records ==
=== Men ===
EVENT	ATHLETE	MARK	DATE	VENUE
Mile	Noureddine Morceli (ALG)	3:44.39	5 September	Rieti, Italy
10,000 metres	Richard Chelimo (KEN)	27:07.91	5 July	Stockholm, Sweden
10,000 metres	Yobes Ondieki (KEN)	26:58.38	10 July	Oslo, Norway
110 m hurdles	Colin Jackson (GBR)	12.91	20 August	Stuttgart, Germany
4 × 400 m Relay	United States (USA) • Andrew Valmon • Quincy Watts • Butch Reynolds • Michael Johnson	2:54.29	22 August	Stuttgart, Germany
High Jump	Javier Sotomayor (CUB)	2.45m	27 July	Salamanca, Spain
Javelin (new)	Jan Železný (CZE)	95.54m	6 April	Pietersburg, South Africa
Javelin (new)	Jan Železný (CZE)	95.66m	29 August	Sheffield, Great Britain
Half Marathon	Benson Masya (KEN)	1:00:24	3 April	The Hague, Netherlands

- The relay team of the United States in the men's 4x100m, formed by Jon Drummond, Andre Cason, Dennis Mitchell and Leroy Burrell, equal its own world record, set the previous year at the 1992 Summer Olympics, clocking 37.40 on 1993-08-21 at the World Championships in Stuttgart, Germany. The first mark was set by Michael Marsh, Leroy Burrell, Dennis Mitchell and Carl Lewis on 1992-08-08.

=== Women ===
EVENT	ATHLETE	MARK	DATE	VENUE
1500 metres	Qu Yunxia (CHN)	3:50.46	11 September	Beijing, PR China
3,000 metres	Zhang Linli (CHN)	8:22.06	12 September	Beijing, PR China
3,000 metres	Wang Junxia (CHN)	8:12.19	12 September	Beijing, PR China
3,000 metres	Wang Junxia (CHN)	8:06.11	13 September	Beijing, PR China
10,000 metres	Wang Junxia (CHN)	29:31.78	8 September	Beijing, PR China
20,000 metres	Izumi Maki (JPN)	1:06:48.8	20 September	Amagasaki, Japan
400m Hurdles	Sally Gunnell (GBR)	52.74	19 August	Stuttgart, Germany
Pole vault	Sun Caiyun (CHN)	4.11m	21 March	Guangzhou, China
60 meters	Irina Privalova (RUS)	6.92	9 February	Madrid, Spain

- Sun's PV of 4.11m was not officially recognised as a record as there were only 2 competitors (regulations require a minimum of 3)

== Awards ==
=== Men ===
1993 TRACK & FIELD AWARDS	ATHLETE
IAAF World Athlete of the Year	Colin Jackson (GBR)
Track & Field Athlete of the Year	Noureddine Morceli (ALG)
European Athlete of the Year Award	Linford Christie (GBR)
Best Male Track Athlete ESPY Award	Kevin Young (USA)

=== Women ===
1993 TRACK & FIELD AWARDS	ATHLETE
IAAF World Athlete of the Year	Sally Gunnell (GBR)
Track & Field Athlete of the Year	Wang Junxia (CHN)
European Athlete of the Year Award	Sally Gunnell (GBR)
Best Female Track Athlete ESPY Award	Evelyn Ashford (USA)

== Men's Best Year Performers ==
=== 100 metres ===
Main race this year: World Championships 100 metres

RANK	1993 WORLD BEST PERFORMERS	TIME
1.	Linford Christie (GBR)	9.87
2.	Andre Cason (USA)	9.92
3.	Daniel Effiong (NGR)	9.98
4.	Dennis Mitchell (USA)	9.99
5.	Leroy Burrell (USA)	10.02
5.	Carl Lewis (USA)	10.02
5.	Bruny Surin (CAN)	10.02

=== 200 metres ===
Main race this year: World Championships 200 metres

RANK	1993 WORLD BEST PERFORMERS	TIME
1.	Frank Fredericks (NAM)	19.85
2.	John Regis (GBR)	19.94
3.	Carl Lewis (USA)	19.99
4.	Michael Marsh (USA)	20.04
5.	Michael Johnson (USA)	20.06

=== 400 metres ===
Main race this year: World Championships 400 metres

RANK	1993 WORLD BEST PERFORMERS	TIME
1.	Michael Johnson (USA)	43.65
2.	Butch Reynolds (USA)	44.12
3.	Quincy Watts (USA)	44.13
4.	Andrew Valmon (USA)	44.28
5.	Samson Kitur (KEN)	44.34

=== 800 metres ===
Main race this year: World Championships 800 metres

RANK	1993 WORLD BEST PERFORMERS	TIME
1.	Nixon Kiprotich (KEN)	1:43.54
2.	Martin Steele (GBR)	1:43.84
3.	Paul Ruto (KEN)	1:43.92
4.	Johnny Gray (USA)	1:44.03
5.	Sammy Kibet Langat (KEN)	1:44.06

=== 1,500 metres ===
Main race this year: World Championships 1,500 metres

RANK	1993 WORLD BEST PERFORMERS	TIME
1.	Noureddine Morceli (ALG)	3:29.20
2.	Fermín Cacho (ESP)	3:32.01
3.	Abdi Bile (SOM)	3:32.83
4.	Mohamed Suleiman (QAT)	3:33.29
5.	Simon Doyle (AUS)	3:33.39

=== Mile ===
RANK	1993 WORLD BEST PERFORMERS	TIME
1.	Noureddine Morceli (ALG)	3:44.39
2.	Abdi Bile (SOM)	3:51.66
3.	Steve Cram (GBR)	3:52.17
4.	Jim Spivey (USA)	3:52.37
5.	Simon Doyle (AUS)	3:52.56

=== 3,000 metres ===
RANK	1993 WORLD BEST PERFORMERS	TIME
1.	Noureddine Morceli (ALG)	7:29.24
2.	Paul Bitok (KEN)	7:34.98
3.	Moses Kiptanui (KEN)	7:35.79
4.	Brahim Jabbour (MAR)	7:36.54
5.	Jim Spivey (USA)	7:37.04

=== 5,000 metres ===
Main race this year: World Championships 5,000 metres

RANK	1993 WORLD BEST PERFORMERS	TIME
1.	Ismael Kirui (KEN)	13:02.75
2.	Haile Gebrselassie (ETH)	13:03.17
3.	Khalid Skah (MAR)	13:04.67
4.	Yobes Ondieki (KEN)	13:05.09
5.	Richard Chelimo (KEN)	13:05.14

=== 10,000 metres ===
Main race this year: World Championships 10,000 metres

RANK	1993 WORLD BEST PERFORMERS	TIME
1.	Yobes Ondieki (KEN)	26:58.38
2.	Richard Chelimo (KEN)	27:07.91
3.	William Sigei (KEN)	27:16.81
4.	Khalid Skah (MAR)	27:17.74
5.	Moses Tanui (KEN)	27:18.32

=== Half Marathon ===
RANK	1993 WORLD BEST PERFORMERS	TIME
1.	Moses Tanui (KEN)	1:00:15

=== Marathon ===
Main race this year: World Championships Marathon

RANK	1993 WORLD BEST PERFORMERS	TIME
1.	Dionicio Cerón (MEX)	2:08:51
2.	Vincent Rousseau (BEL)	2:09:13
3.	Kim Wan-Ki (KOR)	2:09:25
4.	Gert Thys (RSA)	2:09:31
5.	Cosmas Ndeti (KEN)	2:09:33

=== 110m Hurdles ===
Main race this year: World Championships 110m Hurdles

RANK	1993 WORLD BEST PERFORMERS	TIME
1.	Colin Jackson (GBR)	12.91
2.	Tony Jarrett (GBR)	13.00
3.	Jack Pierce (USA)	13.06
4.	Mark McKoy (CAN)	13.08
5.	Tony Dees (USA)	13.12

=== 400m Hurdles ===
Main race this year: World Championships 400m Hurdles

RANK	1993 WORLD BEST PERFORMERS	TIME
1.	Kevin Young (USA)	47.18
2.	Samuel Matete (ZAM)	47.60
2.	Winthrop Graham (JAM)	47.60
4.	Stéphane Diagana (FRA)	47.64
5.	Eric Keter (KEN)	48.24

=== 3,000m Steeplechase ===
Main race this year: World Championships 3,000m Steeplechase

RANK	1993 WORLD BEST PERFORMERS	TIME
1.	Moses Kiptanui (KEN)	8:06.36
2.	Patrick Sang (KEN)	8:07.53
3.	Alessandro Lambruschini (ITA)	8:08.78
4.	Matthew Birir (KEN)	8:09.42
5.	Mark Croghan (USA)	8:09.76

=== High Jump ===
Main competition this year: World Championships High Jump

RANK	1993 WORLD BEST PERFORMERS	HEIGHT
1.	Javier Sotomayor (CUB)	2.45 WR
2.	Hollis Conway (USA)	2.38
2.	Dragutin Topić (FR Yugoslavia)	2.38
4.	Troy Kemp (BAH)	2.37
4.	Artur Partyka (POL)	2.37
4.	Steve Smith (GBR)	2.37

=== Long Jump ===
Main competition this year: World Championships Long Jump

RANK	1993 WORLD BEST PERFORMERS	DISTANCE
1.	Mike Powell (USA)	8.70
2.	Erick Walder (USA)	8.53
3.	Iván Pedroso (CUB)	8.49
4.	Craig Hepburn (BAH)	8.41
5.	Dion Bentley (USA)	8.39

=== Triple Jump ===
Main competition this year: World Championships Triple Jump

RANK	1993 WORLD BEST PERFORMERS	DISTANCE
1.	Mike Conley (USA)	17.86
2.	Yoelbi Quesada (CUB)	17.68
3.	Leonid Voloshin (RUS)	17.65
4.	Vasiliy Sokov (RUS)	17.59
5.	Denis Kapustin (RUS)	17.54

=== Discus ===
Main competition this year: World Championships Discus Throw

RANK	1993 WORLD BEST PERFORMERS	DISTANCE
1.	Lars Riedel (GER)	68.42
2.	Mike Buncic (USA)	67.12
3.	Erik de Bruin (NED)	67.06
4.	Costel Grasu (ROM)	66.90
5.	Dmitriy Shevchenko (RUS)	66.90

=== Shot Put ===
Main competition this year: World Championships Shot Put

RANK	1993 WORLD BEST PERFORMERS	DISTANCE
1.	Werner Günthör (SUI)	21.98
2.	Randy Barnes (USA)	21.80
3.	Kevin Toth (USA)	21.29
4.	Dragan Perić (FR Yugoslavia)	21.26
5.	Mike Stulce (USA)	21.21

=== Hammer ===
Main competition this year: World Championships Hammer Throw

RANK	1993 WORLD BEST PERFORMERS	DISTANCE
1.	Andrey Abduvaliyev (UZB)	82.78
2.	Sergey Kirmasov (RUS)	82.54
3.	Igor Astapkovich (BLR)	82.28
4.	Sergey Litvinov (RUS)	82.16
5.	Aleksandr Seleznyov (RUS)	81.70

=== Javelin (new design) ===
Main competition this year: World Championships Javelin Throw

RANK	1993 WORLD BEST PERFORMERS	DISTANCE
1.	Jan Železný (CZE)	95.66
2.	Raymond Hecht (GER)	88.90
3.	Patrik Bodén (SWE)	88.26
4.	Mick Hill (GBR)	86.94
5.	Vladimir Sasimovich (BLR)	86.48

=== Pole Vault ===
Main competition this year: World Championships Pole Vault

RANK	1993 WORLD BEST PERFORMERS	HEIGHT
1.	Sergey Bubka (UKR)	6.05
2.	Rodion Gataullin (RUS)	6.00
3.	Jean Galfione (FRA)	5.93
4.	Maksim Tarasov (RUS)	5.90
4.	Denis Petushinskiy (RUS)	5.90
4.	Grigoriy Yegorov (KAZ)	5.90

=== Decathlon ===
Main competition this year: World Championships Decathlon

RANK	1993 WORLD BEST PERFORMERS	POINTS
1.	Dan O'Brien (USA)	8817
2.	Eduard Hämäläinen (BLR)	8724
3.	Paul Meier (GER)	8548
4.	Christian Schenk (GER)	8500
5.	Alain Blondel (FRA)	8444

== Women's Best Year Performers ==
=== 60 meters ===
RANK	1993 WORLD BEST PERFORMERS	TIME
1.	Irina Privalova (RUS)	6.92
2.	Gail Devers (USA)	6.95
3.	Merlene Ottey (JAM)	7.01
4.	Natalya Pomoshchnikova-Voronova (RUS)	7.06
5.	Zhanna Block (UKR)	7.07

=== 100 metres ===
Main race this year: World Championships 100 metres

RANK	1993 WORLD BEST PERFORMERS	TIME
1.	Merlene Ottey (JAM)	10.82
1.	Gail Devers (USA)	10.82
3.	Gwen Torrence (USA)	10.86
4.	Irina Privalova (RUS)	10.94
5.	Mary Onyali (NGR)	10.97

=== 200 metres ===
Main race this year: World Championships 200 metres

RANK	1993 WORLD BEST PERFORMERS	TIME
1.	Merlene Ottey (JAM)	21.77
2.	Irina Privalova (RUS)	21.88
3.	Gwen Torrence (USA)	21.92
4.	Marie-José Pérec (FRA)	21.99
5.	Galina Malchugina (RUS)	22.22

=== 400 metres ===
Main race this year: World Championships 400 metres

RANK	1993 WORLD BEST PERFORMERS	TIME
1.	Ma Yuqin (CHN)	49.81
2.	Jearl Miles (USA)	49.82
3.	Gwen Torrence (USA)	49.83
4.	Irina Privalova (RUS)	49.89
5.	Juliet Campbell (JAM)	50.11

=== 800 metres ===
Main race this year: World Championships 800 metres

RANK	1993 WORLD BEST PERFORMERS	TIME
1.	Maria de Lurdes Mutola (MOZ)	1:55.43
2.	Liu Dong (CHN)	1:55.54
3.	Qu Yunxia (CHN)	1:56.24
4.	Ella Kovacs (ROM)	1:56.58
5.	Argentina Paulino (MOZ)	1:56.62

=== 1,500 metres ===
Main race this year: World Championships 1,500 metres

RANK	1993 WORLD BEST PERFORMERS	TIME
1.	Qu Yunxia (CHN)	3:50.46
2.	Wang Junxia (CHN)	3:51.92
3.	Zhang Linli (CHN)	3:57.46
4.	Wang Renmei (runner) (CHN)	3:58.64
5.	Liu Li (CHN)	3:59.34

=== Mile ===
RANK	1993 WORLD BEST PERFORMERS	TIME
1.	Violeta Szekely (ROM)	4:21.69
2.	Lyudmila Rogachova (RUS)	4:22.33
3.	Lyubov Kremlyova (RUS)	4:22.46
4.	Sonia O'Sullivan (IRL)	4:22.94
5.	Anna Brzezińska (POL)	4:23.08

=== 3,000 metres ===
Main race this year: World Championships 3,000 metres

RANK	1993 WORLD BEST PERFORMERS	TIME
1.	Wang Junxia (CHN)	8:06.11 WR
2.	Qu Yunxia (CHN)	8:12.18
3.	Zhang Linli (CHN)	8:16.50
4.	Ma Liyan (CHN)	8:19.78
5.	Zhang Lirong (CHN)	8:21.84

=== 5,000 metres ===
RANK	1993 WORLD BEST PERFORMERS	TIME
1.	Sonia O'Sullivan (IRL)	14:45.92
2.	Elana Meyer (RSA)	14:46.41
3.	Annette Peters (USA)	14:56.07
4.	Maria Albertina Dias (POR)	15:05.12
5.	Zhong Huandi (CHN)	15:05.69+

=== 10,000 metres ===
Main race this year: World Championships 10,000 metres

RANK	1993 WORLD BEST PERFORMERS	TIME
1.	Wang Junxia (CHN)	29:31.78 WR
2.	Zhong Huandi (CHN)	30:13.37
3.	Zhang Lirong (CHN)	31:09.25
4.	Ma Liyan (CHN)	31:10.46
5.	Sally Barsosio (KEN)	31:15.38

=== Half Marathon ===
RANK	1993 WORLD BEST PERFORMERS	TIME
1.	Valentina Yegorova (RUS)	1:09:35

=== Marathon ===
Main race this year: World Championships Marathon

RANK	1993 WORLD BEST PERFORMERS	TIME
1.	Wang Junxia (CHN)	2:24:07
2.	Qu Yunxia (CHN)	2:24:32
3.	Zhang Linli (CHN)	2:24:42
4.	Zhang Lirong (CHN)	2:24:52
5.	Olga Markova (RUS)	2:25:27

=== 60 m hurdles ===
RANK	1993 WORLD BEST PERFORMERS	TIME
1.	Ludmila Narozhilenko (RUS)	7.70
2.	Julie Baumann (SUI)	7.86
3.	Eva Sokolova (RUS)	7.92
4.	LaVonna Martin-Floreal (USA)	7.99
5.	Patricia Girard (FRA)	8.01

=== 100m Hurdles ===
Main race this year: World Championships 100m Hurdles

RANK	1993 WORLD BEST PERFORMERS	TIME
1.	Gail Devers (USA)	12.46
2.	Marina Azyabina (RUS)	12.47
3.	Zhang Yu (CHN)	12.64
4.	Lynda Goode (USA)	12.67
5.	Svetla Dimitrova (BUL)	12.71

=== 400m Hurdles ===
Main race this year: World Championships 400m Hurdles

RANK	1993 WORLD BEST PERFORMERS	TIME
1.	Sally Gunnell (GBR)	52.74
2.	Sandra Farmer-Patrick (USA)	52.79
3.	Margarita Ponomaryova (RUS)	53.48
4.	Kim Batten (USA)	53.84
5.	Han Qing (CHN)	53.96

=== High Jump ===
Main competition this year: World Championships High Jump

RANK	1993 WORLD BEST PERFORMERS	HEIGHT
1.	Stefka Kostadinova (BUL)	2.05 m
2.	Heike Henkel (GER)	2.01 m
3.	Tatyana Shevchik (BLR)	2.00 m
3.	Alina Astafei (ROM)	2.00 m
3.	Ioamnet Quintero (CUB)	2.00 m

=== Long Jump ===
Main competition this year: World Championships Long Jump

RANK	1993 WORLD BEST PERFORMERS	DISTANCE
1.	Heike Drechsler (GER)	7.21 m
2.	Jackie Joyner-Kersee (USA)	7.08 m
3.	Lyudmila Ninova (AUT)	7.06 m
4.	Irina Mushailova (RUS)	7.02 m
5.	Yao Weili (CHN)	7.01 m

=== Triple Jump ===
Main competition this year: World Championships Triple Jump

RANK	1993 WORLD BEST PERFORMERS	DISTANCE
1.	Anna Biryukova (RUS)	15.09 m
2.	Iolanda Chen (RUS)	14.97 m
3.	Irina Mushailova (RUS)	14.79 m
4.	Inna Lasovskaya (RUS)	14.70 m
5.	Niurka Montalvo (CUB)	14.51 m

=== Discus ===
Main competition this year: World Championships Discus Throw

RANK	1993 WORLD BEST PERFORMERS	DISTANCE
1.	Larisa Korotkevich (RUS)	68.14
2.	Olga Burova (RUS)	67.40 m
3.	Ellina Zvereva (BLR)	66.32 m
4.	Cao Qi (CHN)	66.08 m
5.	Daniela Costian (AUS)	66.02 m

=== Shot Put ===
Main competition this year: World Championships Shot Put

RANK	1993 WORLD BEST PERFORMERS	DISTANCE
1.	Svetlana Krivelyova (RUS)	20.84 m
2.	Huang Zhihong (CHN)	20.57 m
3.	Anna Romanova (RUS)	20.24 m
4.	Wang Yawen (CHN)	19.89 m
5.	Zhang Zhiying (CHN)	19.77 m

=== Hammer ===
RANK	1993 WORLD BEST PERFORMERS	DISTANCE
1.	Olga Kuzenkova (RUS)	64.64
2.	Svetlana Sudak (BLR)	63.70
3.	Mihaela Melinte (ROM)	62.52
4.	Aya Suzuki (JPN)	60.90
5.	Natalya Vasilenko (UKR)	59.80

=== Javelin (old design) ===
Main competition this year: World Championships Javelin Throw

RANK	1993 WORLD BEST PERFORMERS	DISTANCE
1.	Trine Hattestad (NOR)	72.12 m
2.	Natalya Shikolenko (BLR)	68.96 m
3.	Karen Forkel (GER)	67.94 m
4.	Teresė Nekrošaitė (LTU)	66.34 m
5.	Silke Renk (GER)	65.80 m

=== Heptathlon ===
Main competition this year: World Championships Heptathlon

RANK	1993 WORLD BEST PERFORMERS	POINTS
1.	Jackie Joyner-Kersee (USA)	6837
2.	Sabine Braun (GER)	6797
3.	Ma Miaolan (CHN)	6750
4.	Tatyana Blokhina (RUS)	6703
5.	Svetlana Buraga (BLR)	6635

== Births ==
- January 1 - Sifan Hassan, Ethiopian-born Dutch runner
- March 7
  - Roman Danyliuk, Ukrainian athlete
  - Alysbeth Félix, Puerto Rican athlete
- May 16 - Steven Solomon, Australian sprinter

== Deaths ==
- January 24 — Detlef Gerstenberg (35), East German hammer thrower (b. 1957)
- November 9 — Anne Smith (52), British middle-distance runner (b. 1941)
