= Sport in Tenerife =

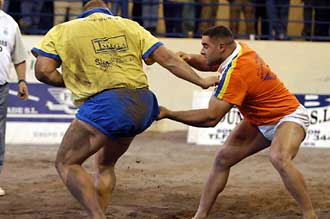
Canarian Wrestling

On the island of Tenerife, in the Canary Islands, many sports are practiced, both outdoors and indoors in the various facilities available throughout the island.

Among the sports practiced on the island include the following:

== Canary Islands sports ==
=== Canarian wrestling ===
Canarian wrestling is practiced on the island, and may be compared to other forms of western African wrestling such as Senegalese wrestling. The fight takes place in a circle, usually on sand, and the two fighters face each other and wrestle until one is felled. There are 26 fighters in Tenerife. The island has numerous teams including two German women's wrestling teams and a league organized by the island institutions, federations and clubs with 24 schools participating in wrestling.

=== Palo canario ===
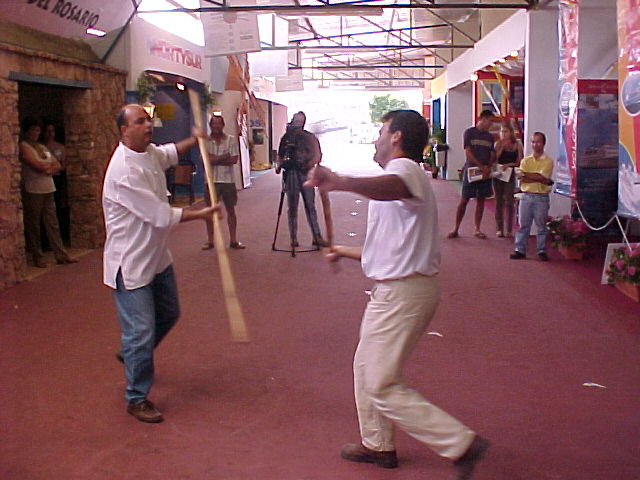
Palo Canario

The game of palo canario ("juego del palo") is a martial art that is practiced between two players who go into battle using sticks without actually making contact with the body of the adversary. The origin of the game was a method of warfare used by early settlers to ward off invaders and was not intended for leisure.

Tenerife has several notable Palo canario clubs: Club-Escuela Acosta de los Campitos, Club-Escuela Las Mercedes, Club-Escuela Maragat, Club-Escuela Tagoror Chiregua, Club-Grupo Bijache de Arafo, Club-Grupo Chimenchia Las Canteras, Club-Grupo Hirgwan.

=== Bola canaria ===
Similar to the French game of boules, bola canaria is a sport that basically consists of gaining points by bowling balls as close to an object as possible. It is played on a rectangular field of sand or soil between 18 and 25 m in length and a width of between 3.5 and 6 m. In Paris, there are some thirty teams that are organized into three categories (first, second and second B). In the third week of August there is a special independent competition when teams can be mixed.

=== Rural sports ===
On the island there are also sports events related to rural areas, primitive sports such as the lifting of stones and the carrying of livestock, the latter which has an official tournament organized by the Asociación Canaria de Arrastre. In April, there is a rural sports exhibition for the whole Canaries usually held in Tegueste.

== Water sports ==
The island lies in an ideal location for water sports due to its climate and location.

=== Stand Up Pedal Board ===
Stand up pedal boarding is a new type of surfing provided in Tenerife at Las Vistas beach in Los Cristianos. The pedal board is powered by the legs and the steering control on the handlebar. It does not require seats, paddles or overboard splashes. It has a stable and dynamic design, and offers an alternative to other types of surfing, like SUP and Hawaiian surf.

=== Surfing, windsurfing and kitesurfing ===
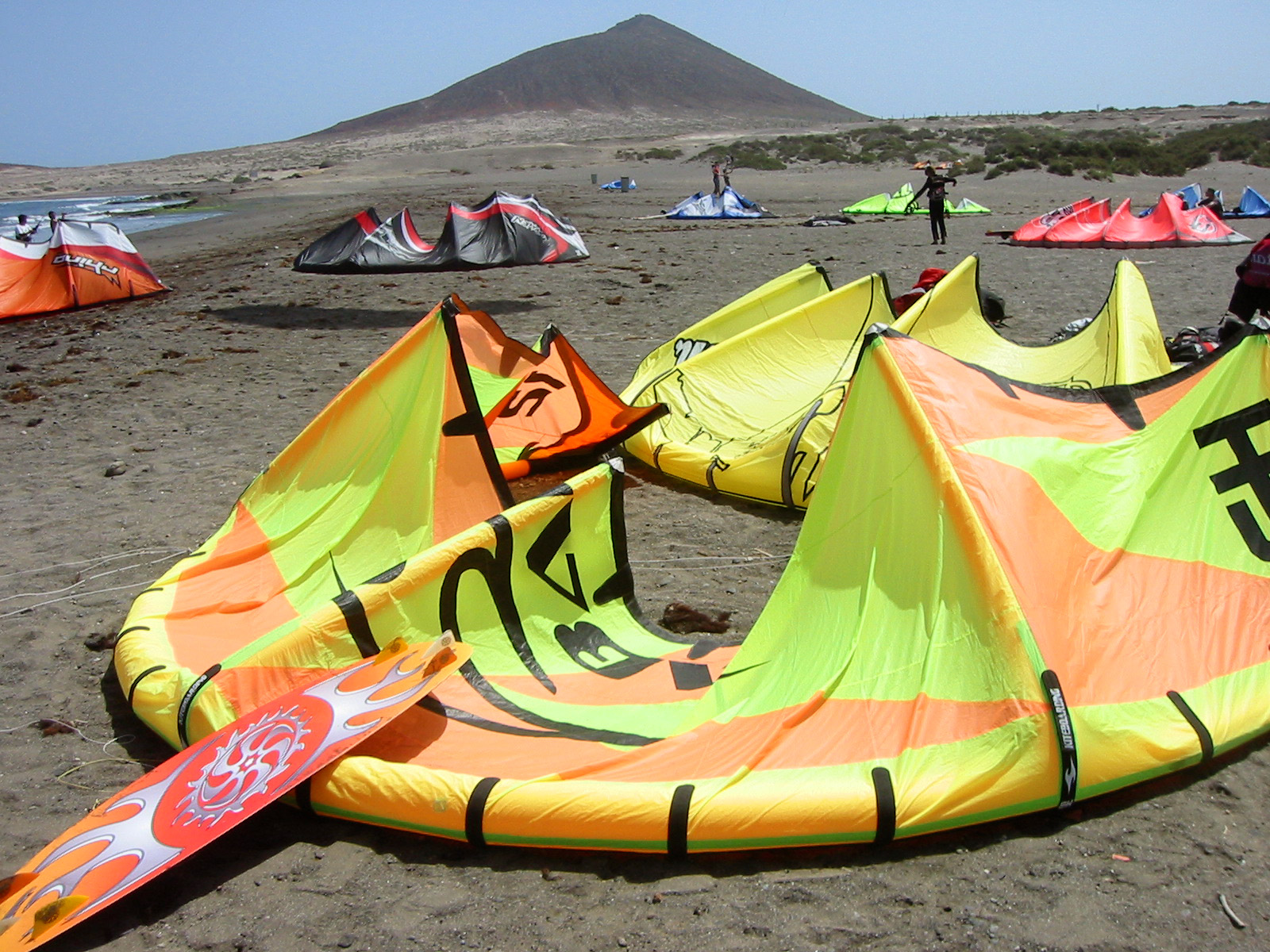
Kitesurfing gear on a beach in El Médano.

On the island traditional surfing is practiced, as is windsurfing, and kitesurfing. The island has ten schools and several courses devoted to learning these sports. The main areas for the practice of these disciplines are at El Médano, Playa de Las Américas, the coast of Santa Cruz de Tenerife, Güímar, the coasts of Valle de La Orotava, and especially at Playa del Socorro in Los Realejos. Windsurfing competition has been held in several grand slam contests for the World Cup in the disciplines of "wave", "slalom" and "race course".

=== Diving ===
As with surfing and windsurfing, there are many diving schools and clubs throughout the coast of Tenerife. On the island there are up to thirty areas for diving where it is possible not only to discover interesting marine flora and fauna, but also in some places to explore the wrecks of sunken ships. Among the best places for diving are Las Galletas, Playa Paraíso and the Punta de la Rasca al Sur, as well as Garachico, Puerto de la Cruz or the Punta de Teno al Norte. The presence of species such as turtles, a permanent colony of pilot whales, and the existence of the bottlenose dolphin means that diving is never done alone.

=== Swimming ===
Swimming is one of the most practiced sports on the island, either in pools or on the shores of the island. There is not only swimming, but water polo, with the Club Natación Martiánez which competes in the National Spanish Water Polo League, synchronized swimming, and long distance "open water" swimming. In Tenerife, there are six teams in the swimming federation: C.N. Teneteide, C.N Alameda, C.N. Echeyde, C.D. Teimar, C.N. Tenerife Masters and C.N Martiánez.

=== Boating ===
Tenerife is ideally placed in the centre of the Canary Islands to offer all types of water sports such as sailing, motor cruising and powerboating. Chartering a yacht, or joining a sailing course, enables one to explore the unspoilt areas of Tenerife as well as further afield to other islands such as La Gomera, La Palma and Gran Canaria. Official competitions exist in regards to boating which include the Vellatina, Laser', Snipe, Crucero and the Optimist, for example. Some events are held purely for competitors on the island, while others feature competition from throughout the Canary Islands, Spain, or even internationally. The first ever RYA (Royal Yachting Association) overseas training centre Club Sail was established on the island and still offers training in all types of boating. There are also various sport fishing clubs that exist on the island and a championship of offshore fishing.

== Aerial sports ==
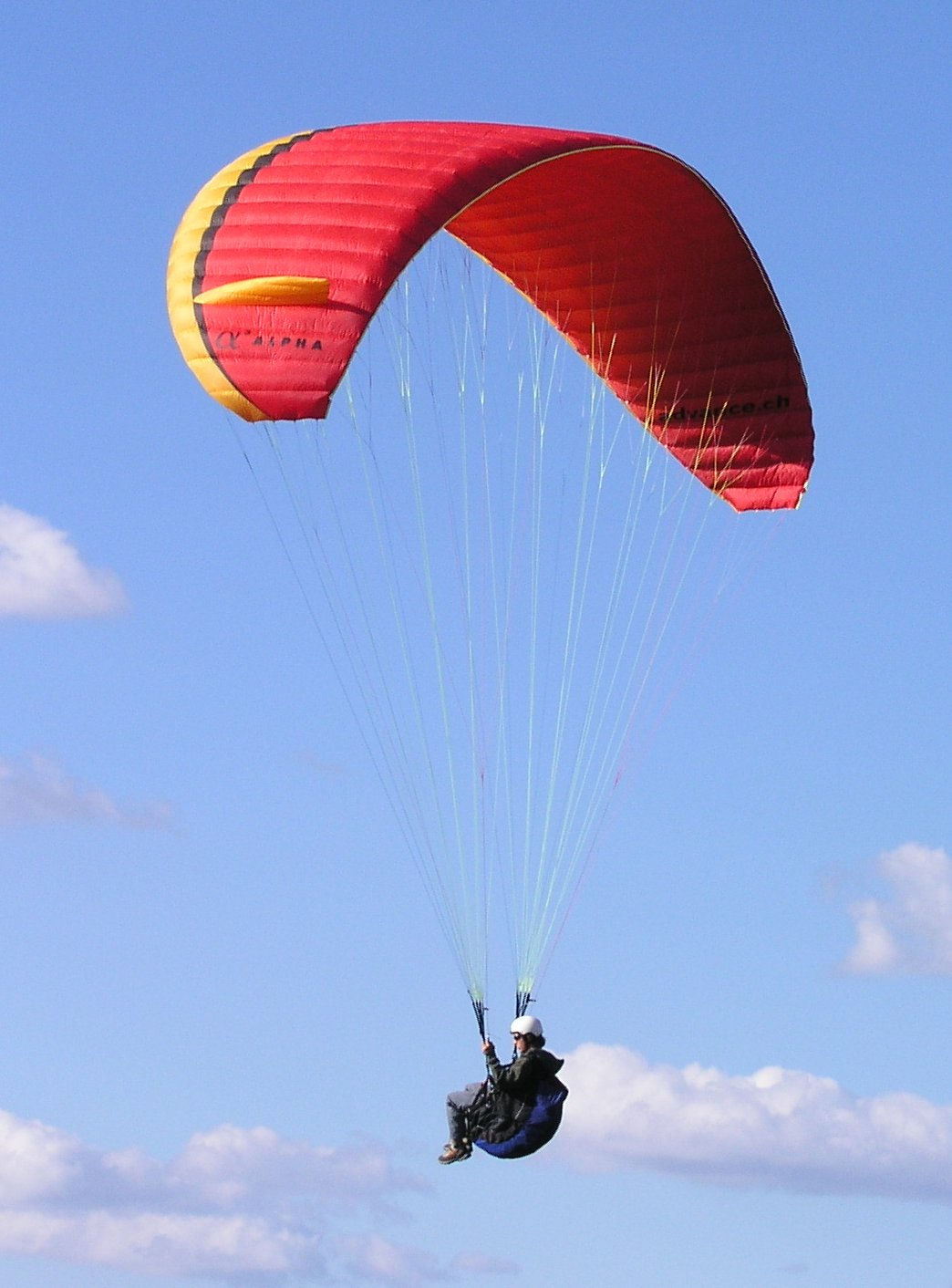
Parapente.

In another sense, sports such as skydiving and paragliding play an important role. The Festival Internacional de Parapente (International Festival of Paragliding) (FLYPA) is held in Los Realejos. There are more than 40 places on the island which are used for these aerial sports.

== Motor sports ==
In Tenerife, motocross, karting and rallying are three motorsports practiced on the island. Throughout the year, rally competitions are held in their various divisions which take place as part of the regional championship of the Canary Islands. Asphalt rallies are conducted in three tests: Rally Isla de Tenerife, Rally de Granadilla and Rally Villa de Adeje. In the mountain rallying category, there are seven tests, including Güímar. There is also a slalom event held at Arico.

== Other sports ==
In addition to the above, other sports are played on the island:

=== Volleyball ===
Volleyball is one of the island's most successful sports, particularly in women's volleyball where CV Tenerife were European champions and participate in the Spanish Super League. Two other teams are the women's CV Aguere 2009/2010 Super League champions and the men's Arona Playa de las Américas which competes in the Spanish Super League. There is a growing interest in this sport in Tenerife.

=== Football ===
As in much of the rest of Spain, football is, by far, the sport most practiced and followed by all the island. The Federación Tinerfeña de Fútbol (Football Federation of Tenerife) has a total of 305 teams competing in the different leagues, and football fields are spread throughout the island territory. Chelsea and Spain forward Pedro Rodriguez was born in Tenerife.

The most prominent men's football team in Tenerife is Club Deportivo Tenerife, based in Santa Cruz de Tenerife, who play in the Segunda División (Spanish Second Division) and has competed as high as the First Division, La Liga, on several occasions. Another team from Tenerife is Club Deportivo San Isidro.

In the women's game the most prominent team is Unión Deportiva Tenerife, based in Adeje. They currently compete in the Liga F, the highest league of women's football.

=== Roller Hockey ===
The city has a roller hockey team, CP Tenerife, one of the most important in Spain, and dispute the main League OK Liga.

=== Basketball ===
In Tenerife, there is also an opportunity to practice basketball, and many schools and colleges offer the chance to learn and practice the sport. Specifically, the Liga LEB, the second top level Spanish competition includes two teams from this island: Tenerife Rural and Club Baloncesto Canarias. Tenerife was the host city for the 2018 FIBA Women's Basketball World Cup.

=== Baseball ===
Tenerife is home to a baseball academy run by the Atlanta Braves, which has resulted in a number of amateur signings. The island's baseball club, the Marlins Puerto Cruz, is among the more successful clubs in Spain's top baseball circuit, the Division de Honor de Beisbol.

=== Hiking ===
The extensive network of roads and pathways on the island allows hiking. Numerous associations or companies organize trips into the hills, mountains or along rural roads on the island. Canyoning is a speciality in regards to hiking, and takes the hiker to inaccessible places with high-value natural landscapes. Cliff top walking is common and there is also ropes and climbing equipment available in some places.

=== Golf ===
Golf is a sport that has extensive courses and facilities for practice in Tenerife. It is a discipline which is highly tourism-oriented and generates significant revenue on the island but consequently places a large demand on available water resources. There are a total of nine golf courses on the island. These include Real Club de Golf de Tenerife, Abama Golf, Golf Las Americas, Golf Costa Adeje, Golf del Sur, Amarilla Golf & Country Club, Centro de Golf Los Palos, Buenavista Golf and Golf La Rosaleda.

=== Rugby union ===
Tenerife has its own rugby team.

=== Other ===
Various other sports played on Tenerife include cycling, rowing, tennis, squash, horse riding, judo, karate, and athletics. Also worth mentioning is the ultramarathon CajaMar Tenerife Bluetrail, the highest race in Spain and second in Europe, with the participation of several countries and great international repercussions.
