= 1993 World Championships in Athletics – Women's 3000 metres =

These are the official results of the Women's 3000 metres event at the 1993 World Championships in Athletics in Stuttgart, Germany. There were a total number of 47 participating athletes, with three qualifying heats and the final held on Monday 16 August 1993.

== Final ==
Rank	Athlete	Nation	Time
1st place, gold medalist(s)	Qu Yunxia	China	8:28.71
2nd place, silver medalist(s)	Zhang Linli	China	8:29.25
3rd place, bronze medalist(s)	Zhang Lirong	China	8:31.95
4.	Sonia O'Sullivan	Ireland	8:33.38
5.	Alison Wyeth	Great Britain & N.I.	8:38.42
6.	Yelena Romanova	Russia	8:39.69
7.	Paula Radcliffe	Great Britain & N.I.	8:40.40
8.	Lyudmila Borisova	Russia	8:40.78
9.	Yvonne Murray	Great Britain & N.I.	8:43.46
10.	Annette Peters	United States	8:45.56
11.	Yelena Kopytova	Russia	8:50.49
12.	Claudia Lokar	Germany	8:51.35
13.	Annemari Sandell	Finland	8:53.58
14.	Luminita Zaituc	Romania	9:01.38
15.	Esther Kiplagat	Kenya	9:07.05

== Qualifying heats ==
- Held on Saturday 1993-08-14

Rank	Athlete	Nation	Time
1.	Zhang Linli	China	8:48.85
2.	Yvonne Murray	Great Britain & N.I.	8:51.30
3.	Yelena Romanova	Russia	8:54.81
4.	Esther Kiplagat	Kenya	8:55.07
5.	Luminita Zaituc	Romania	8:55.55
6.	Claudia Lokar	Germany	8:55.98
7.	Roberta Brunet	Italy	8:57.46
8.	Julia Sakara	Zimbabwe	8:57.69 NR
9.	Regina Cistjakova	Lithuania	8:58.51
10.	Ulla Marquette	Canada	9:00.68
11.	Elly van Hulst	Netherlands	9:04.86
12.	Katy McCandless	United States	9:10.13
13.	Andrea Sollarova	Slovakia	9:12.91
14.	Jayanthi Palaniappan	Malaysia	9:18.42 NR
15.	Martha Portobanco	Nicaragua	10:48.08
16.	Halima Boubacar	Niger	11:26.13

Heat 2
Rank	Athlete	Nation	Time
1.	Qu Yunxia	China	8:49.20
2.	Lyudmila Borisova	Russia	8:50.02
3.	Annette Peters	United States	8:51.67
4.	Alison Wyeth	Great Britain & N.I.	8:51.89
5.	Annemari Sandell	Finland	8:54.75
6.	Annette Sergent	France	8:58.15
7.	Elena Fidatov	Romania	8:58.89
8.	Valentina Tauceri	Italy	9:00.20
9.	Julia Vaquero	Spain	9:05.50
10.	Eva Doczi	Hungary	9:09.51
11.	Daria Nauer	Switzerland	9:11.28
12.	Getenesh Urge	Ethiopia	9:16.24
13.	Marilu Salazar	Peru	9:32.33
14.	Tevdenshigmed Enh-Od	Mongolia	10:50.27
—	Raj Kumari Pandey	Nepal	DNS
—	Zahra Ouaziz	Morocco	DNS

Heat 3
Rank	Athlete	Nation	Time
1.	Sonia O'Sullivan	Ireland	8:50.62
2.	Zhang Lirong	China	8:51.75
3.	Paula Radcliffe	Great Britain & N.I.	8:52.62
4.	Yelena Kopytova	Russia	8:57.73
5.	Margareta Keszeg	Romania	8:59.21
6.	Farida Fates	France	8:59.93
7.	Sheila Carrozza	United States	9:01.41
8.	Estela Estevez	Spain	9:08.04
9.	Nina Christiansen	Denmark	9:09.06
10.	Harumi Hiroyama	Japan	9:11.77
11.	Leah Pells	Canada	9:16.63
12.	Gwen Griffiths	South Africa	9:33.96
13.	Aura Morales	Guatemala	9:49.08
14.	Shirley Cespedes	Costa Rica	10:15.01
15.	Gulsara Dadabayeva	Tajikistan	10:29.69
16.	Adelaide Malepa	Lesotho	11:00.68
—	Ravilya Agletdinova-Kotovich	Belarus	DNF

== See also ==
- 1988 Women's Olympic 3000 metres (Seoul)
- 1990 Women's European Championships 3000 metres (Split)
- 1992 Women's Olympic 3000 metres (Barcelona)
- 1994 Women's European Championships 3000 metres (Helsinki)
- 1996 Women's Olympic 5000 metres (Atlanta)
