= Norimi Sakurai =

Japanese ultramarathon runner (born 1971)

Personal information
- Born: April 20, 1971 (age 55)

Sport
- Country: Japan
- Sport: Ultramarathon
Medal record
Representing Japan
ultramarathon
IAU World Championship
| Gold medal – first place | 2007 Winschoten Netherlands | 100km |

Norimi Sakurai (櫻井教美, Sakurai Norimi; born 20 April 1971) is a Japanese ultramarathon runner. Sakurai is the current women's 100 km Track world record holder, and the current women's 6H Track world record holder, and 2007 female winner of IAU 24-Hour Run 100 km World Championship. She is a three time female winner of 100 km Lake Saroma Ultramarathon and a five-time female winner of Hasetsune cup, an endurance trail race in Japan.

== Achievements ==
=== World Records ===
- Women's 100 km Track, 7:14:06, Lupatotissima Italy, Sep 2003
- Women's 6hour Track, 83.200 kilometres (51.698 miles), Lupatoto Verone Italy, Sept 2003

=== World Championship ===
- 2007 female winner of IAU 24-hour run 100 km World Championship, 7:00:27, Winschoten Netherlands

=== Other races ===
- 2001, 2003, 2007 female winner of Lake Saroma Ultramarathon, an IAU endorsed official 100 km race in Hokkaido, Japan
- 2002, 2003, 2005, 2006, 2008 female winner of Hasetsune cup, a 71.5 km trail in steep mountains in Japan. Sakurai's 2008 time of 8:54:07 is the current course record.

== Personal life ==
Sakurai was in the school's athletic club in her teens, and competed on the Wandervogel Club in University. After joining her first full marathon in 1996, Sakurai started joining various types of ultramarathon events. She now works for Adventure Divas and runs as a guide for people with hearing difficulties.

When Sakurai won the 2007 World Championship in Netherland, she ran with her water bottle in hand until the next aid station came. When asked, she answered that she did not want to throw it on the street.
