= Takahiro Sunada =

Japanese long-distance runner

Sunada, Takahiro
Personal information
- Full name: Sunada, Takahiro
- Nationality: Japanese
- Born: January 19, 1973 (age 53) Osaka, Japan

Sport
- Country: Japan
- Sport: Running
- Event(s): Marathon, Ultramarathon

Achievements and titles
- Personal best(s): 100km 6:13:33; Marathon 2:10:08
Medal record
Men's track and field
IAU 100 km World Championships
Bronze medal – third place	1999 Chavagnes-en-Paillers	100km
IAAF World Cup Marathon
Silver medal – second place	1995 Athens	Marathon
IAU 100km European Championships
Gold medal – first place	2000 Belvès	100km
Lake Saroma Ultramarathon
Gold medal – first place	1998 Tokoro	100km

Takahiro Sunada (砂田貴裕, Sunada Takahiro; born 19 January 1973) is a Japanese ultramarathon and marathon runner born in Osaka. He was the World Athletics male world record holder over the 100 km ultramarathon distance, with a time of 6:13:33 (Lake Saroma-Tokoro Japan June 21, 1998) until it was broken by Nao Kazami in 2018 with a time of 6:09:14. His personal best time for the marathon is 2:10:07 (Berlin, Germany September 10, 2000), where he finished in 4th place.

== Achievements ==
Year	Competition	Venue	Position	Event	Notes
Representing Japan
1998	Lake Saroma Ultramarathon	Tokoro, Japan	1st	Ultra Marathon	6:13:33 WR
1999	IAU 100 km World Championships	Chavagnes-en-Paillers, France	3rd	Ultra Marathon	6:26:06
2000	IAU European Championships	Belvès, France	1st	Ultra Marathon	6:17:17
2000	Berlin Marathon	Berlin, Germany	4th	Marathon	2:10:07
