= Nao Kazami =

Japanese long-distance runner

Kazami, Nao
Personal information
- Full name: Kazami, Nao
- Nationality: Japanese
- Born: April 9, 1983 (age 43)

Sport
- Country: Japan
- Sport: Running
- Events: Marathon, Ultramarathon

Achievements and titles
- Personal bests: 100km: 6:09:14 WR Marathon: 2:10:08 Half Marathon: 1:03:25

Nao Kazami (風見尚, Kazami Nao; born April 9, 1983) is a Japanese ultramarathon and marathon runner. He is the former male 100 km run world record holder with a time of 6:09:14. He set the then record on June 24, 2018, at the Lake Saroma Ultramarathon, an official World Athletics race held annually in Hokkaido, Japan. Kazami bettered Takahiro Sunada's 1998 record by almost four minutes. His personal best time for the marathon is 2:13:13 (Tokyo Marathon, Tokyo on March 1, 2020),
