= Hiroko Sho =

Personal information
- Born: 1970 (age 55–56) Chiba

Sport
- Country: Japan
- Sport: ultramarathon/marathon
Medal record
Ultramarathon
Representing Japan
IAU 100 km World Championships
Gold medal – first place	2005 Saroma Japan	100km Road
Bronze medal – third place	2006 Misari South Korea	100km Road
Bronze medal – third place	2007 Winschoten Netherlands	100km Road

Hiroko Sho (翔ひろ子, Sho Hiroko; born 1970) is a Japanese ultramarathon and marathon runner. Sho won gold and bronze medals in IAU 100 km Road World Championship in 2005, 2006 and 2007. She is the five-time winner of Tsukuba Marathon.

Year	Competition	Venue	Position	Event	Notes
Representing Japan
2007	World Championships	(Netherlands) Winschoten	3rd	100 km Road	7:27:12
2006	World Championships	(South Korea) Misari	3rd	100 km Road	7:31:48
2005	World Championships	(Japan) Saroma	1st	100 km Road	7:53:41
