= Hong Kong Four Trails Ultra Challenge =

Ultramarathon in Hong Kong

- Date: First day of Lunar New Year (usually January or February)
- Location: Hong Kong
- Event type: Ultramarathon; Mountain running
- Distance: 298 km
- Established: 2012; 14 years ago
- Organizer: Andre Blumberg
- Website: https://www.facebook.com/HK4TUC/
- Participants: 26 (2026)

Hong Kong Four Trails Ultra Challenge (Chinese: 香港四徑超級挑戰), or HK4TUC (Chinese: 四徑; lit. 'Four Trails'), is an annual ultramarathon race in Hong Kong. Considered one of the most challenging mountain races worldwide, participants have to run through within 72 hours the famous quadruple hiking trails in Hong Kong known as "Four Trails": MacLehose, Wilson, Hong Kong, and Lantau. The ultramarathon spans a total distance of 298 kilometres with a cumulative elevation of 14,500 metres, starting from Tuen Mun and ends at the green post box outside Silvermine Bay Ferry Pier in Mui Wo.

== History ==
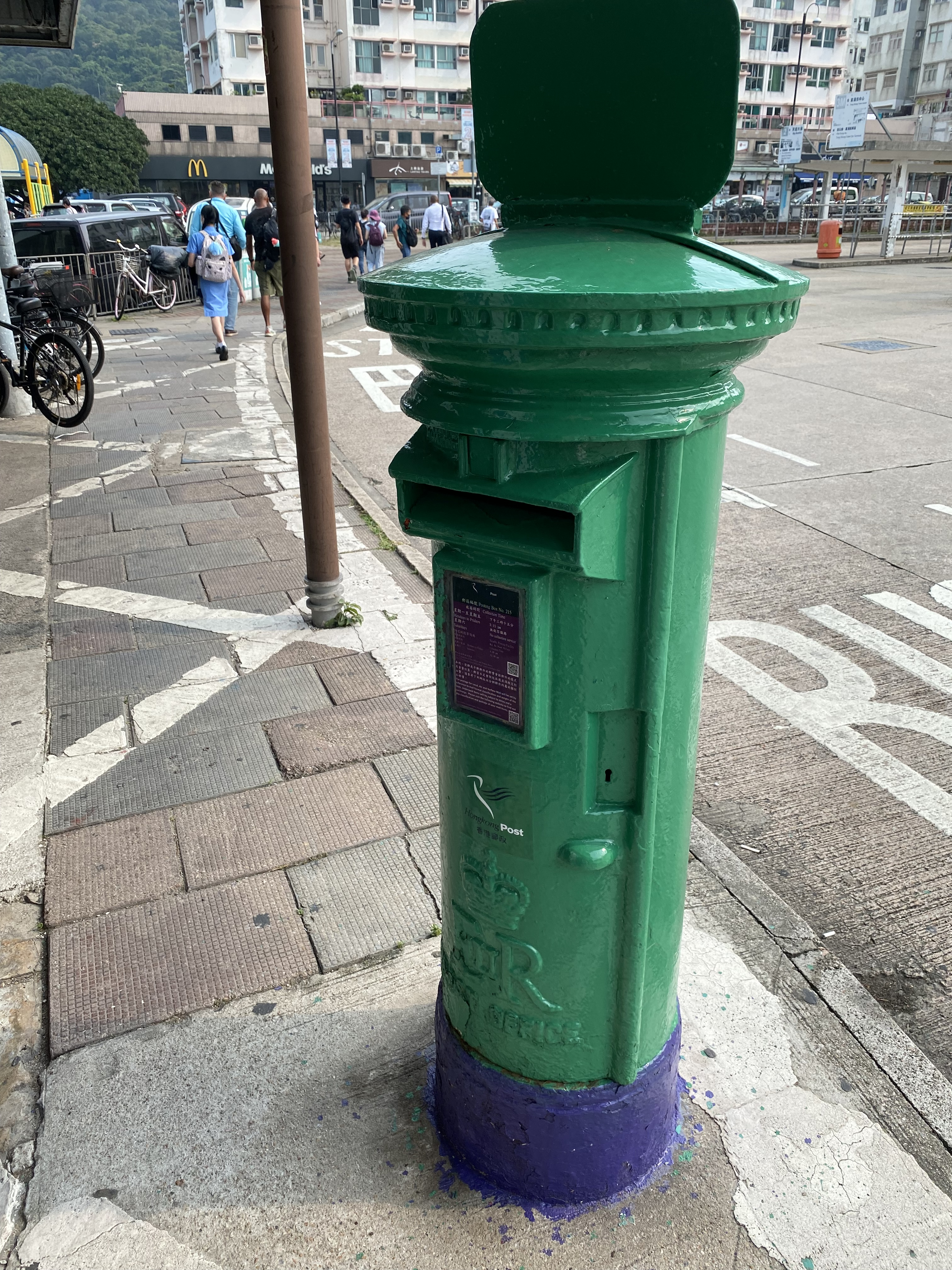
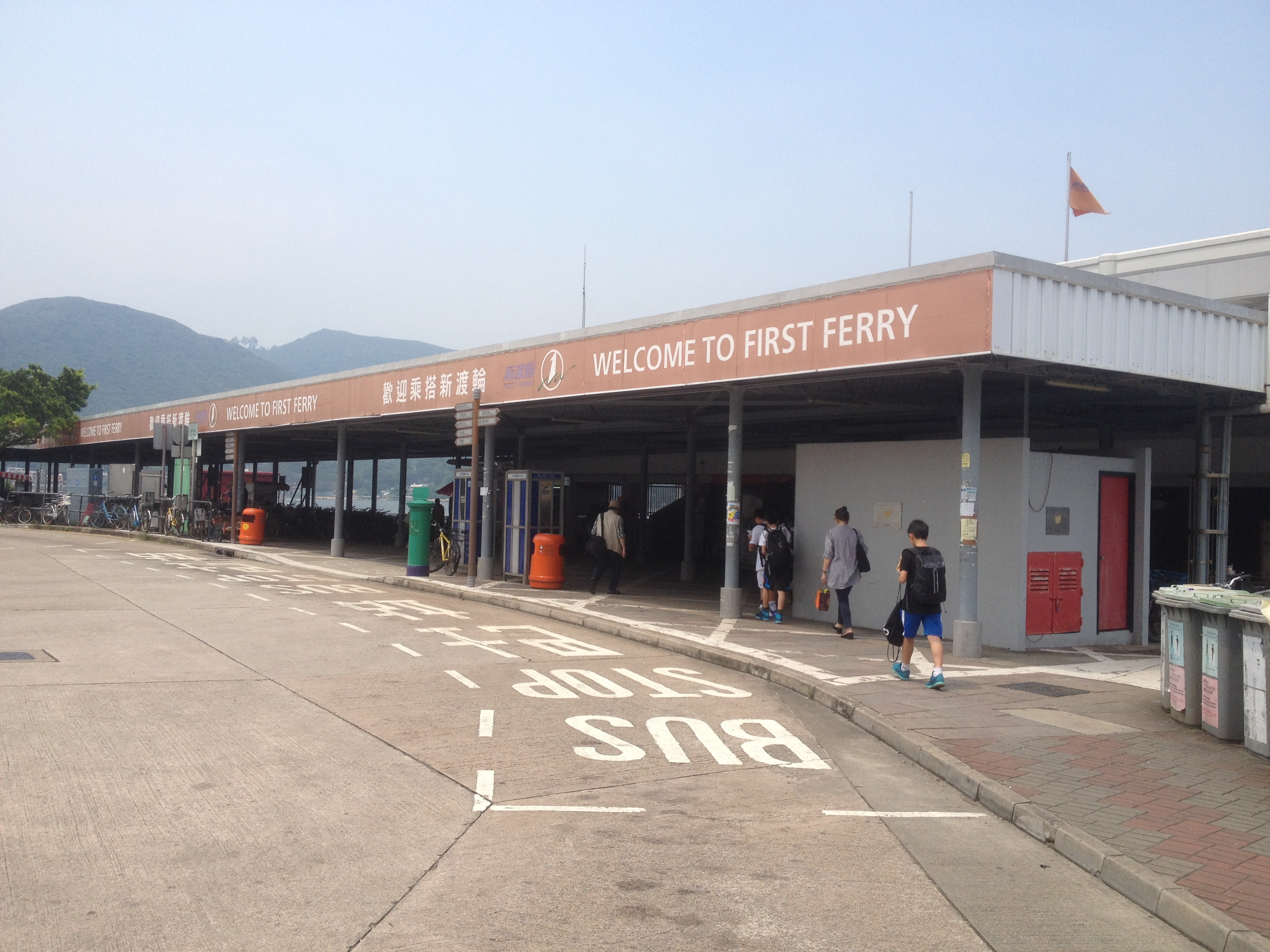
The green post box outside Silvermine Bay Ferry Pier, where the race ends

This challenge was founded in 2012 by German expat Andre Blumberg, who had moved to Hong Kong. He explained that his intention at the time was to challenge himself and get back into shape before hitting a mid-life crisis. He set a goal of completing all four major trails within four days and ultimately succeeded in doing so on his own. In 2013, he invited other runners to join, shortening the challenge from four days to three, with 3 out of 5 participants successfully completing it.

From 2014 onward, Andre Blumberg shifted from being a runner to becoming the event’s organizer. The challenge has since been held annually during the first three days of the Lunar New Year. Runners may submit an application, and Blumberg decides on invitations based on their track record and motivation. Around twenty runners are typically selected each year. The event offers no medals, rankings, entry fees, or prize money. However, starting in 2014, two honorary titles were introduced: “Finisher” and “Survivor.” A runner earns the title of “Finisher” if they complete all four trails within 60 hours — an accolade regarded as a prestigious honor in the trail running community. Among the six participants in 2014, only Vic So managed to complete all four trails in 62 hours, earning the title of “Survivor,” though he fell short of finishing within the required time.

In 2017, director Robin Lee filmed a 45-minute documentary about the Four Trails Challenge, titled "Breaking 60 | Challenging the Impossible" which aired on Apple TV+. The documentary chronicled the arduous journey of a runner who, for the first time that year, completed the challenge under 60 hours, becoming a "finisher."

After that, Blumberg introduced new rules almost every year to increase the difficulty:

- 2017: Cut-off of 80 hours imposed for “Survivor” category
- 2019: Cut-off reduced to 75 hours
- 2020: Cut-off reduced to 72 hours
- 2021: No hiking poles or music
- 2022: No painkillers
- 2023: Start time shifted from morning to evening, participants therefore have to endure an extra night without sleep
- 2024: Start time announced only 12 hours before the race
- 2025: No watches; start time announced 6 hours before the race

The 2021 race only invited past finishers and survivors amidst the coronavirus pandemic. Prominent runners including Stone Tsang and Tom Robertshaw withdrew during the race, with Jacky Leung making history as the first that breaks the 50-hour mark. Four Trails, a film that documents that year's challenge, was released in 2025.

== Four Trails ==
MacLehose Trail

Wilson Trail

Hong Kong Trail

Lantau Trail

The entire challenge covers a total distance of 298 kilometres, with a cumulative elevation gain of 14,500 metres. Runners must complete all four trails individually and without help from others apart from supply facilities along the routes, such as grocery stores and vending machines, and transportation between trails. Each runner could be joined by only one support crew member and one driver during the transportation. Rest and sleep breaks are allowed during the race, but the time spent will count towards the overall result.

The four trails, individually ran in reverse from the finishing point back to the start and in the following sequence, are:

=== MacLehose Trail ===
100 kilometres running west to east, from Tuen Mun New Town to Pak Tam Chung, traversing several country parks including Tai Lam, Tai Mo Shan (highest peak in the city), Shing Mun, Kam Shan, Lion Rock, Ma On Shan, and Sai Kung East and West

- Runners must complete within the cut-off time of 18 hours
- Runners will then be taken to the next starting point by car

=== Wilson Trail ===
78 kilometres running north to south, from Nam Chung to Stanley, traversing Pat Sin Leng, Tai Mo Shan and several hills in New Territories and Kowloon outskirt before crossing the harbour on the MTR underground, then passing through Quarry Bay and Tai Tam

- Runners must cross the harbour on the MTR (Lam Tin station to Tai Koo station via Kwun Tong line, Tseung Kwan O line, and Island line)
- Taking the MTR to Taikoo Station is also considered part of the trail race, and no supporting crew member are allowed during this transition
- Runners will then be taken to the next starting point by car

=== Hong Kong Trail ===
50 kilometres running east to west, from Tai Long Wan to Victoria Peak

- Runners must take the ferry at Central Piers to the next starting point
- Starting from 2023 runners can no longer travel by car and must walk from Victoria Peak to the Central Pier.

=== Lantau Trail ===
70 kilometres looping clockwise with starting and ending both at the green post box outside Silvermine Bay Ferry Pier in Mui Wo

- Runners must start Lantau Trail before 54 hours have elapsed

== Records ==
The record holder is Wong Ho-chung who achieved a result of 46 hours 55 minutes in 2022. He, along with another local Jacky Leung, are the duo "breaking 50" achievement holders. Nikki Han and Cheung Man-yee are the only two female finishers. The youngest successful participant is Sarah Pemberton, completing the race in 70 hours 45 minutes in 2020 at the age of 26.

Only seven runners have claimed the "finisher" title twice: Nugo Yamanath Limbu, Jacky Leung, Salomon Wettstein, Hyun Chang Chung, Nikki Han, Tomokazu Ihara and Liu Fo-lok .

=== List of Finishers ===
	Finisher		Result	Year	Notes
1	(Hong Kong)	Wong Ho-chung	46 hours 55 minutes	2022	Breaking 50
2	(Hong Kong)	Jacky Leung Chun-keung	49 hours 26 minutes	2021	Breaking 50 Finisher Twice
2	(Hong Kong)	Jacky Leung Chun-keung	58 hours 31 minutes	2020	Breaking 50 Finisher Twice
3	(Switzerland)	Salomon Wettstein	51 hours 53 minutes	2021	Finisher Twice
3	(Switzerland)	Salomon Wettstein	54 hours 14 minutes	2018	Finisher Twice
4	(Hong Kong)	Liu Fo-lok	52 hours 2 minutes	2024	Finisher Twice
4	(Hong Kong)	Liu Fo-lok	56 hours 42 minutes	2026	Finisher Twice
5	(United Kingdom)	Tom Robertshaw	53 hours	2017	
6	(Japan)	Tomokazu Ihara	54 hours 2 minutes	2023	Finisher Twice
6	(Japan)	Tomokazu Ihara	57 hours 42 minutes	2019	Finisher Twice
7	(Hong Kong)	Stone Tsang Siu-keung	54 hours 15 minutes	2017	
8	(Nepal)	Nugo Yamanath Limbu	54 hours 26 minutes	2020	Finisher Twice
8	(Nepal)	Nugo Yamanath Limbu	56 hours 29 minutes	2023	Finisher Twice
9	(Australia)	Stephen Redfern	54 hours 46 minutes	2020	
10	(France)	Julien Chorier	55 hours 12 minutes	2026	
11	(Denmark)	Kristian Joergensen	55 hours 52 minutes	2019	
12	(Hong Kong)	Thomas Lam Shing-yip	55 hours 32 minutes	2022	
13	(Hong Kong)	Eric Leung Wai-yip	56 hours 1 minutes	2024	
14	(Singapore)	Abimanyu Shunmugam	56 hours 6 minutes	2020	
15	(Japan)	Takashi Doi	56 hours 25 minutes	2020	
16	(Hong Kong)	Joseph Yeung Chi-shing	56 hours 26 minutes	2022	
17	(United Kingdom)	Ryan Whelan	56 hours 54 minutes	2023	
18	(Hong Kong)	Wong Ka-kit	57 hours 11 minutes	2023	
19	(United Kingdom)	Richard Kimber	57 hours 27 minutes	2022	
20	(Philippines)	Jag Lanante	57 hours 45 minutes	2017	
21	(Hong Kong)	Cheung Man-yee	57 hours 53 minutes	2022	
22	(Thailand)	Phairat Varasin	57 hours 54 minutes	2018	
23	(Hong Kong)	Man Wing Yam	58 hours 9 minutes	2026	
24	(Hong Kong)	Law Kai-pong	58 hours 11 minutes	2020	
25	(Japan)	Tetsuya Fukui	58 hours 15 minutes	2024	
26	(Scotland)	Nikki Han	58 hours 20 minutes	2019	Finisher Twice
26	(Scotland)	Nikki Han	59 hours 42 minutes	2021	Finisher Twice
27	(United Kingdom)	Scott Pugh	58 hours 43 minutes	2026	
28	(Hong Kong)	Lau Chun-man	58 hours 55 minutes	2021	
29	(China)	Leon Jiang Liangjun	58 hours 58 minutes	2024	
30	(South Korea)	현창충; Hyun Chang Chung	59 hours 23 minutes	2021	Finisher Twice
30	(South Korea)	현창충; Hyun Chang Chung	59 hours 46 minutes	2020	Finisher Twice
31	(Austria)	Markus Schieder	59 hours 24 minutes	2026	
32	(Hong Kong)	Kevin Cheung Kei-fung	59 hours 30 minutes	2023	
33	(India)	Mayank Vaid	59 hours 43 minutes	2024	
34	(Taiwan)	Chiu Wen-hsiao	59 hours 45 minutes	2017	
35	(Hong Kong)	Law Chor-kin	59 hours 50 minutes	2021	

=== List of past sessions ===
	Time limit		Runners	Completed		Year best
	Finisher	Survivor	Runners	Finisher	Survivor	Year best
1st (2012)	4 days	—N/a	1	1	—N/a	Andre Blumberg
2nd (2013)	3 days	—N/a	5	3	—N/a	
3rd (2014)	60 hours	No time limit	6	0	1	Vic So, 62:00
4th (2015)	60 hours	No time limit	4	0	1	Jag Lanante, 81:30
5th (2016)	60 hours	No time limit	23	0	11	Tom Robertshaw, 60:38
6th (2017)	60 hours	80 hours	22	4	5	Tom Robertshaw, 53:00
7th (2018)	60 hours	75 hours	28	2	5	Salomon Wettstein, 54:14
8th (2019)	60 hours	75 hours	29	3	6	Kristian Joergensen, 55:52
9th (2020)	60 hours	72 hours	33	7	5	Nugo Limbu, 54:00
10th (2021)	60 hours	72 hours	18	6	5	Jacky Leung, 49:26
11th (2022)	60 hours	72 hours	16	5	2	Wong Ho-chung, 46:55
12th (2023)	60 hours	72 hours	25	5	10	Tomokazu Ihara, 54:02
13th (2024)	60 hours	72 hours	19	5	5	Liu Fo-lok, 52:02
14th (2025)	60 hours	72 hours	15	0	11	Nugo Limbu, 60:49
15th (2026)	60 hours	72 hours	26	5	10	Julien Chorier, 55:12
Total (2014–2026) (Note: Excluding repeated participations and runners in 2012 and 2013)			264	42	77	

== See also ==
- Hong Kong Marathon
- Trailwalker
