= Durbano =

Durbano is a surname. Notable people with the surname include:

- Steve Durbano (1951–2002), Canadian ice hockey player
- Walter Durbano (born 1963), Italian long-distance runner
