= Lake Saroma Ultramarathon =

- Date: June
- Location: 3 Towns of Yubetsu, Saroma and Tokoro, Hokkaido Prefecture, Japan
- Event type: Road running
- Distance: 100 km/50 km
- Established: 1987
- Website: Official website

The Lake Saroma Ultramarathon is an annual 100 km and 50 km Ultramarathon foot road race held in June in the northeastern shore of Hokkaido, Japan since 1987. It is an IAU-labeled official 100 km and 50 km race, and an official JAAF race, and an AIMS (Association of International Marathons)-certified course. Its 1994 event was Asia's first IAU (International Association of Ultrarunners) 100 km World Championship, and its 20th event in 2005 was also held as the IAU 100 km Road World Championship.

== Course ==
Location of Lake Saroma in Japan

The 100 km race starts at the Sports Center in the town of Yubetsu in the west of Lake Saroma, takes a course around the Lake Saroma with two main peaks of around 40 meters and finishes at the Sports Center in the Town of Tokoro. Men's 100 km course record is 6:09:14 achieved in 2018 by Nao Kazami, and women's course record is 6:33:11 achieved in 2000 by Tomoe Abe. Both records are current IAU and World Athletics 100 km road world records. Time limit to finish the 100 km race is 13 hours. Notable athletes who had run the race include Erick Wainaina in 2010 and 2013.

The 50 km race starts at the Town of Saroma, finishing at the same place as the 100 km race in the town of Tokoro. Time limit to finish the 50 km race is 8 hours.

The course' scenic beauty was described as "one of the most beautiful Ultra courses" by Malcolm Campbell, the founder and then president of IAU who visited Saroma in 1994 to announce the start of the race.

== 100 km Results and Data ==
Course Records (also current 100 km Road world record)

- Men 6:09:14, 2018, Nao Kazami, Japan
- Ladies 6:33:11, 2000, Tomoe Abe, Japan

2013

Temperature during the race: 11.0-23.7 degree Celsius
Finishing rate : 68.9%

- Men
1. Nojo Hideo, Japan 6:37:16
2. Takayoshi Shigemi, Japan 6:41:44
3. Tsutomu Nagata, Japan 6:44:33
4. Yoshiki Takada, Japan 6:49:53
5. Erick Wainaina, Kenya 6:55:09
- Ladies
1. Mai Fujisawa, Japan 8:10:39
2. Tomoko Hara, Japan 8:23:33
3. Hisayo Matsumoto, Japan 8:30:37
4. Wakako Oyagi, Japan 8:31:13
5. Mikiko Ota, Japan 8:33:10

2012

Temperature during the race : 9.5-14.1 degree Celsius
Finishing rate : 75.6%

- Men

1 Yoshikazu Hara, Japan 6:33:32

- Ladies

1 Shiho Katayama, Japan 7:33:38

2011

Temperature during the race : 8.7-25.6 degree Celsius
Finishing rate : 68.2%

- Men

1 Kiyokatsu Hasegawa, Japan 6:31:06

- Ladies

1 Naomi Ochiai, Japan 7:54:08

2010

Temperature during the race : 19.5-28.0 degree Celsius
Finishing rate : 49.9%

- Men

1 Erick Wainaina, Kenya 6:39:52

- Ladies

1 Emi Matsushita, Japan 7:49:31

2009

Temperature during the race : 13.0-16.0 degree Celsius
Finishing rate : 73.4%

- Men

1 Hideo Nojo, Japan 6:36:33

- Ladies

1 Emi Iwasaki, Japan 8:09:36

2008

Temperature during the race : 9.0-16.0 degree Celsius
Finishing rate : 73.0%

- Men

1 Masakazu Takahashi, Japan 6:42:05

- Ladies

1 Hiroko Sho (or, Syou), Japan 7:38:04

2007

Temperature during the race : 11.0-17.5 degree Celsius
Finishing rate : 72.1%

- Men

1 Shin-ichi Watanabe , Japan 6:29:57

- Ladies

1 Norimi Sakurai, Japan 7:16:23

2006

Temperature during the race : 12.0-23.5 degree Celsius
Finishing rate : 67.8%

- Men

1 Yoshiaki Kobayashi, 6:49:15

- Ladies

1 Hiroko Sho (or, Syou), Japan 7:40:30

2005

Temperature during the race : 15.0-25.0 degree Celsius
Finishing rate : 68.3%

- Men

1 Gregory Murzin, Russia 6:24:15

- Ladies

1 Hiroko Sho (or, Syou), Japan 7:53:41

2004

Temperature during the race : 15.0-26.0 degree Celsius
Finishing rate : 62.5%

- Men

1 Tsutomu Sassa, Japan 6:23:00

- Ladies

1 Makiko Hotta, Japan 7:38:31

2003

Temperature during the race : 10.0-13.0 degree Celsius
Finishing rate : 73.5%

- Men

1 Yoshiaki Kobayashi, Japan 6:38:06

- Ladies

1 Norimi Sakurai, Japan 7:20:02

2002

Temperature during the race : 17.0-29.0 degree Celsius
Finishing rate : 60.8%

- Men

1 Yasufumi Mikami, Japan 6:48:07

- Ladies

1 Makiko Hotta, Japan 7:30:23

2001

Temperature during the race : 17.5-29.8 degree Celsius
Finishing rate : 47.0%

- Men

1 Yasufumi Mikami, Japan 6:38:50

- Ladies

1 Norimi Sakurai, Japan 8:00:41

2000

Temperature during the race : 10.0-29.0 degree Celsius
Finishing rate : 57.5%

- Men

1 Yasufumi Mikami, Japan 6:27:13

- Ladies

1 Tomoe Abe, Japan 6:33:11 (Current World Record of Ladies' 100 km marathon)

1999

Temperature during the race : 9.3-14.5 degree Celsius

- Men

1 Yasufumi Mikami, Japan 6:22:08

- Ladies

1 Akiko Sekiya, Japan 8:03:44

1998

Temperature during the race : 9.0-11.0 degree Celsius

- Men

1 Takahiro Sunada, Japan 6:13:33

- Ladies

1 Masako Koyama, Japan 8:21:26

1997

- Men

1 Yasufumi Mikami, Japan 6:24:56

- Ladies

1 Reiko Hirosawa, Japan 8:19:48

1996

- Men

1 Patrick Macke, Great Britain 6:56:13

- Ladies

1 Noriko Kawaguchi, Japan 7:11:42

1995

- Men

1 Kiminari Kondo, Japan 6:26:23

- Ladies

1 Mary Morgan, Australia 7:49:40

1994

- Men

1 Alexei Wolgin, Russia 6:22:43

- Ladies

1 Walentina Schatjajewa, Russia 7:34:58

1993

- Men

1 Narihisa Kojima, Japan 6:43:14

- Ladies

1 Eiko Endo, Japan 8:22:25

1992

- Men

1 Narihisa Kojima, Japan 6:36:34

- Ladies

1 Eiko Endo, Japan 8:17:01

1991

- Men

1 Narihisa Kojima, Japan 6:37:44

- Ladies

1 Eiko Endo, Japan 8:28:23

1990

- Men

1 Toshiro Kashihara, Japan 6:52:33

- Ladies

1 Takako Suzuki, Japan 8:47:09

1989

- Men

1 Toshiro Kashihara, Japan 6:52:41

- Ladies

1 Takako Suzuki, Japan 8:37:13

1988

- Men

1 Toshiro Kashihara, Japan 7:06:35

- Ladies

1 Takako Suzuki, Japan 8:40:07

1987

- Men

1 Koji Inoue, Japan 6:52:14

- Ladies

1 Takako Suzuki, Japan 9:24:10

1986 (pre event)

- Men

1 Masatoshi Tandai, Japan 7:49:17

- Ladies

1 Harumi Kajita, Japan 11:07:38
