= Ma Liyan =

Chinese long-distance runner

Medal record

Women's athletics

Representing China

IAAF World Marathon Cup
Gold medal – first place	1993 San Sebastián	Team

Ma Liyan (born 3 November 1968) is a Chinese former long-distance runner. Her time of 8:19.78 minutes for the 3000 metres at the National Games of China in 1993 makes her the fourth fastest runner ever over the distance. She represented China in the marathon at the 1993 World Championships in Athletics and was a team gold medallist at the IAAF World Marathon Cup that year.

The validity of her performances has been questioned, given her quick improvements and the fact that several runners with the same coach (Ma Junren) later tested positive for doping.

== 1993 breakthrough ==
Part of Ma Junren's training group, all of Ma Liyan's career highlights occurred in 1993.

Her first outing was in the marathon for the 1993 National Games of China, where she placed sixth in a race dominated by her training group. Having finished in 2:25:46 hours, she was ranked the seventh fastest athlete in the world that year, but was only sixth in the race itself, won by Wang Junxia almost two minutes quicker.

Then, at the 1993 Chinese athletics championships held in June in the city of Jinan, Ma Liyan clocked 8:49.27 minutes to place sixth in the women's 3000 metres and 33:35.24 minutes to place sixteenth in the 10,000 metres.

She was China's sole entrant in the marathon at the 1993 World Championships in Athletics, but failed to finish the distance on her international debut.

The highlight of her career came in the Chinese Games track and field programme in September. First, she ran a best of 31:10.46 minutes to place fourth in the women's 10,000 metres (won by Wang Junxia in a world record). Ma followed this with a run of 8:19.78 minutes in the heats of the 3000 metres. This time was faster than the world record for the event but left her in third place as Wang led again. In the final, Wang improved further to improve that mark, while Ma placed fourth in a time of 8:21.26 minutes, which ranked as the seventh fastest time ever and remains the fastest time recorded for such a low finish. Her last outing of the year, and the last major race of her career, came at the 1993 IAAF World Marathon Cup in November. There the Chinese women won with a perfect score by taking the top four spots, with Ma coming fourth in 2:30:44 hours.

The significant improvements to world records at the Chinese Games, and the strength in depth of the times, attracted international consternation of the results at the national event. The sudden emergence of the runners, the large improvements to world records, and the sudden disappearance of runners from the international scene led to accusations of doping. American distance runner Mary Slaney said the performances would "ruin the sport" and head of USA Track and Field Ollan Cassell said "If these suspicions aren't cleared up, it's a big problem". Ma's coach, Ma Junren, attributed his athletes success to hard training, turtle shell soup and cordyceps sinensis (a caterpillar fungus). His coaching career endured significant criticism in 2000 when six of his athletes tested positive for erythropoietin, a banned blood-boosting product. Ma Liyan's performances, and those by others in her group, remain listed as among the fastest women's times in long-distance running, but that legacy has been tempered by scepticism around the circumstances of the results.

== Later career ==
In February 1994, it became known that Ma Liyan, alongside teammates Wang Junxia, Zhang Linli, and Zhang Lirong, was pencilled in for the London Marathon. However, the whole team did not eventually participate. In October 1994, Ma Liyan, now running under the name Lu Ou, won the bronze medal in 8:58.58 minutes at the Asian Games in Hiroshima, behind teammate Zhang Linli and Japan's Harumi Hiroyama.

She left Ma Junren during the December 1994 mutiny alongside, amongst others, Wang Junxia, Ma Ningning, Wang Yuan, Wang Xiaoxia, Zhang Linli, Liu Li, Lu Yi, Liu Dong and Zhang Lirong. Ma was one of the signatories of an alleged 1995 letter denouncing state-sponsored doping of Chinese track athletes that emerged in 2016. The case has since been under investigation by the IAAF.

== Personal bests ==
- 3000 metres – 8:19.78 min (1993)
- 10,000 metres – 31:10.46 min (1993)
- Marathon – 2:25:46 hrs (1993)

== International competition record ==
Year	Competition	Venue	Position	Event	Notes
1993	World Championships	Stuttgart, Germany	—	Marathon	DNF
1993	World Marathon Cup	San Sebastián, Spain	4th	Marathon	2:30:44
1993	World Marathon Cup	San Sebastián, Spain	1st	Team	
