= La Ultra =

Ultramarathon sporting event

La Ultra is an Ultramarathon and running event held in the Ladakh region of Indian Administered Kashmir. The marathon subjects participants to extreme climate, distances of up to 555 kms, and altitudes of up 17,500 ft and is deemed one of the toughest runs in the world.
