= Luca Barzaghi =

Italian athletics competitor

Personal information
- Nationality: Italian
- Born: 1 June 1968 (age 58)

Sport
- Country: Italy
- Sport: Athletics
- Event: Marathon

Achievements and titles
- Personal best: Marathon: 2:10:53 (1993)
Medal record
World Marathon Cup
| Silver medal – second place | 1993 San Sebastián | Team |

Luca Barzaghi (born 1 June 1968) is an Italian male retired marathon runner, which participated at the 1995 World Championships in Athletics.

== Achievements ==
| Year | Competition | Venue | Position | Event | Performance | Notes |
|---|---|---|---|---|---|---|
| 1995 | World Championships | (Sweden) Gothenburg | 33rd | Marathon | 2:23:51 | |
