= Don Ritchie (disambiguation) =

Don Ritchie (1926–2012) was an Australian humanitarian.

Don Ritchie or Donald Ritchie may also refer to:

- Don Ritchie (runner) (1944–2018), Scottish ultramarathon runner
- Donald A. Ritchie (born 1945), Historian Emeritus of the United States Senate

== See also ==
- Donald Richie (1924–2013), an American author
