= Severino Bernardini =

Italian long-distance runner

Personal information
- Nationality: Italian
- Born: 31 March 1966 (age 60) Domodossola, Italy

Sport
- Country: Italy
- Sport: Athletics
- Event: Marathon
- Club: Comelit Bergamo

Achievements and titles
- Personal bests: 5000 m: 13:42.4 (1988); 10000 m: 28:35.82 (1988); Half marathon: 1:05:17 (2000); Marathon: 2:10:12 (1993)
Medal record
World Marathon Cup
Silver medal – second place	1993 San Sebastián	Team marathon
Silver medal – second place	1993 San Sebastián	Marathon
Event / 1st / 2nd / 3rd; Italian Marathon / 1 / 0 / 0

Severino Bernardini (Domodossola, 31 March 1966) is a former Italian long-distance runner who specialized in the marathon race.

He won two medals at the World Marathon Cup, and Italian Marathon in 1990.

== Biography ==
Severino Bernardini participated at one edition of the European Championships (1994), he has 8 caps in national team from 1987 to 1996.

== Achievements ==
Year	Competition	Venue	Position	Event	Notes
Representing Italy
1994	European Championships	Helsinki, Finland	—	Marathon	DNF

== National titles ==
Severino Bernardini has won one time the individual national championship.

- 1 win in marathon (1988)
