= Fat Ass =

Informal ultramarathon running event

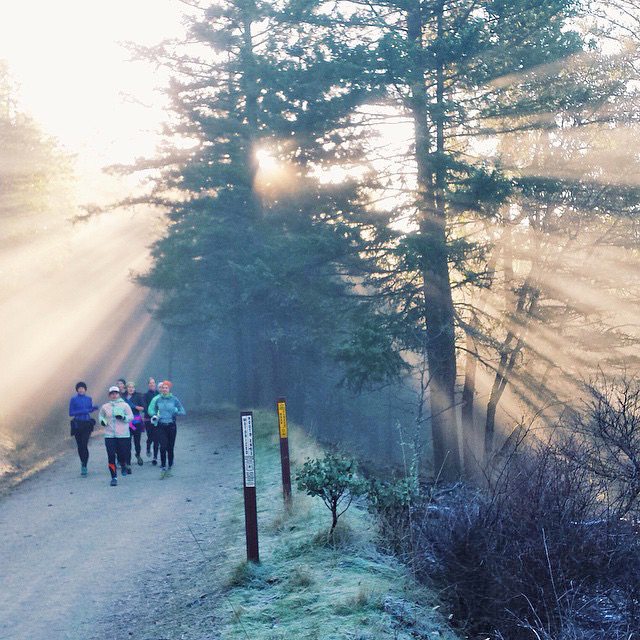
Long distance running in winter

A Fat Ass or fatass is a type of informal ultramarathon running event which started in the San Francisco Bay Area in the late 1970s. Typically organized as a low-key grassroots race that is 25 km (16 mi) or longer, the Fat Ass is usually free to enter.

== Description ==
Fat Ass runs are usually community events and training races with no reward. These events have the unofficial slogan of "No Fees, No Awards, No Aid, No Wimps", meaning entry is usually free but amenities are limited. Some events require the donation of aid items to a communal station. Many people participate to see if they enjoy running ultramarathons before spending money on registering for an official event.

The idea of the Fat Ass came from Joe Oakes, a runner from the San Francisco Bay Area. In 1979, he started the "Recover from the Holidays Fat Ass 50" event. The name of the event is derived from participants wanting to reduce weight after the holiday season. Fat Ass runs are typically held in late autumn or early winter.

== Popularity ==
According to Runner's World, as of 2010, the "Fat Ass" concept was becoming increasingly popular due to their affordability compared to mainstream races and their less cut-throat vibe.
