= Tomoe Abe =

Japanese long-distance runner

Tomoe Abe (Tomoe Kouno since 2006)
Personal information
- Born: August 13, 1971 (age 55) Kitsuki, Ōita
- Height: 149 cm (4 ft 11 in)

Sport
- Country: Japan
- Sport: marathon, ultramarathon
Medal record
Women's athletics
Representing Japan
World Championships
Bronze medal – third place	1993 Stuttgart	Marathon

Tomoe Abe (安部 友恵, Abe Tomoe; born 13 August 1971 in Kitsuki, Ōita) is a retired Japanese ultramarathon and marathon runner who won the bronze medal in the marathon at the 1993 World Championships with a time of 2:31:01. Her personal best time is 2:26:09, achieved when she won the 1994 Osaka Ladies' Marathon.

She is the female world record holder in the ultramarathon of 100 kilometres with a time of 6:33:11, which was set on June 25, 2000, at the Lake Saroma Ultramarathon, an official IAAF (International Association of Athletics Federations) race held annually in Hokkaido, Japan.

== Achievements ==
Year	Competition	Venue	Position	Event	Notes
Representing Japan
1990	World Junior Championships	Plovdiv, Bulgaria	11th	10,000m	35:23.47
1993	World Championships	Stuttgart, Germany	3rd	Marathon	2:31:01
1994	Osaka Ladies Marathon	Osaka, Japan	1st	Marathon	2:26:09
1996	Hokkaido Marathon	Sapporo, Japan	1st	Marathon	2:31:21
1997	World Championships	Athens, Greece	29th	Marathon	2:45:19
2000	Osaka Ladies Marathon	Osaka, Japan	6th	Marathon	2:28:01
2001	Nagoya Marathon	Nagoya, Japan	5th	Marathon	2:27:01
