= 1990 World Junior Championships in Athletics – Women's 10,000 metres =

The women's 10,000 metres event at the 1990 World Junior Championships in Athletics was held in Plovdiv, Bulgaria, at Deveti Septemvri Stadium on 10 August.

== Medalists ==
| Gold | Derartu Tulu; Ethiopia |
| Silver | Rika Ota; Japan |
| Bronze | Lydia Cheromei; Kenya |

== Results ==
=== Final ===
10 August

| Rank | Name | Nationality | Time | Notes |
|---|---|---|---|---|
| 1st place, gold medalist(s) | Derartu Tulu | Ethiopia | 32:56.26 | |
| 2nd place, silver medalist(s) | Rika Ota | Japan | 33:06.85 | |
| 3rd place, bronze medalist(s) | Lydia Cheromei | Kenya | 33:20.83 | |
| 4 | Natalya Galushko | Soviet Union | 33:57.17 | |
| 5 | Claudia Dreher | East Germany | 34:11.20 | |
| 6 | Maria Silvia Pili | Italy | 34:49.04 | |
| 7 | Christelle Fuseau | France | 34:51.52 | |
| 8 | Paola Cabrera | Mexico | 34:52.90 | |
| 9 | Inna Kozina | Soviet Union | 35:04.54 | |
| 10 | Ana Nanu | Romania | 35:12.91 | |
| 11 | Tomoe Abe | Japan | 35:23.47 | |
| 12 | Isabelle Müller | West Germany | 35:27.27 | |
| 13 | Sandra Ruales | Ecuador | 36:06.61 | |
| 14 | Soledad Nieto | Ecuador | 37:06.32 | |
| | María Isabel Martínez | Spain | DNF | |
| | Joanna Campbell-Smith | Australia | DNF | |
| | Beni Gras | Canada | DNF | |
| | Dörte Köster | East Germany | DNF | |

== Participation ==
According to an unofficial count, 18 athletes from 14 countries participated in the event.

- Australia (1)
- Canada (1)
- East Germany (2)
- Ecuador (2)
- Ethiopia (1)
- France (1)
- Italy (1)
- Japan (2)
- Kenya (1)
- Mexico (1)
- Romania (1)
- Soviet Union (2)
- Spain (1)
- West Germany (1)
