= 1993 World Championships in Athletics – Women's marathon =

The Women's Marathon at the 1993 World Championships in Stuttgart, Germany, was held on Sunday August 15, 1993.

== Medalists ==
Gold	Junko Asari; Japan (JPN)
Silver	Manuela Machado; Portugal (POR)
Bronze	Tomoe Abe; Japan (JPN)

== Abbreviations ==
- All times shown are in hours:minutes:seconds

DNS	did not start
NM	no mark
WR	world record
WL	world leading
AR	area record
NR	national record
PB	personal best
SB	season best

== Records ==
Standing records prior to the 1993 World Athletics Championships
World Record	Ingrid Kristiansen (NOR)	2:21:06	April 21, 1985	London, United Kingdom
Event Record	Rosa Mota (POR)	2:25:17	August 29, 1987	Rome, Italy
Season Best	Wang Junxia (CHN)	2:24:07	April 4, 1993	Tianjin, PR China

== Final ranking ==
Rank	Athlete	Time	Note
1st place, gold medalist(s)	Junko Asari (JPN)	2:30:03	
2nd place, silver medalist(s)	Manuela Machado (POR)	2:30:54	
3rd place, bronze medalist(s)	Tomoe Abe (JPN)	2:31:01	
4	Ramilya Burangulova (RUS)	2:33:03	
5	Madina Biktagirova (BLR)	2:34:36	
6	Katrin Dörre-Heinig (GER)	2:35:20	
7	Frith van der Merwe (RSA)	2:35:56	
8	Kimberly Rosenquist-Jones (USA)	2:36:33	
9	Kamila Gradus (POL)	2:36:48	
10	Firiya Zhdanova (RUS)	2:37:59	
11	Akemi Matsuno (JPN)	2:38:04	
12	Maria Rebelo (FRA)	2:38:33	
13	Anna Rybicka (POL)	2:39:44	
14	Marian Sutton (GBR)	2:39:45	
15	Judit Földing-Nagy (HUN)	2:41:06	
16	Karen MacLeod (GBR)	2:41:46	
17	Ana Isabel Alonso (ESP)	2:42:53	
18	Ritva Lemettinen (FIN)	2:45:05	
19	Jane Welzel (USA)	2:46:08	
20	Helena Javornik (SLO)	2:51:06	
21	Emperatriz Wilson (CUB)	2:54:11	
22	Su Tzu-Ning (TPE)	2:58:37	
23	Chu Winnie Ng Lai (HKG)	2:58:41	
DID NOT FINISH (DNF)
—	Danuta Bartoszek (CAN)	DNF	
—	Gabrielle O'Rourke (NZL)	DNF	
—	Anne van Schuppen (NED)	DNF	
—	Claudia Metzner (GER)	DNF	
—	Birgit Jerschabek (GER)	DNF	
—	Bettina Sabatini (ITA)	DNF	
—	Rosanna Munerotto (ITA)	DNF	
—	Rakiya Maraoui-Quetier (MAR)	DNF	
—	Ma Liyan (CHN)	DNF	
—	Sally Eastall (GBR)	DNS	

== See also ==
- Women's Olympic Marathon (1992)
- 1993 Marathon Year Ranking
