= 1993 World Marathon Cup =

Athletics competition

The 1993 World Marathon Cup was the fifth edition of the World Marathon Cup of athletics and were held in San Sebastián, Spain.

== Results ==
Team men
#	Nations	Time
1	Ethiopia; Gemechu Kebede; Becho Tadesse; Tumo Turbo	6:31:17
2	Italy; Severino Bernardini; Luca Barzaghi; Walter Durbano	6:32:41
3	Great Britain; Richard Nerurkar; David Buzza; Andrew Green	6:34.06

Team women
#	Nations	Time
1	China; Wang Junxia; Zhang Linli; Zhang Lirong	7:27:43
2	Spain; Maria-Luisa Muñoz; Monica Pont; Rocio Rios	7:33:55
3	Russia; Firiya Sultanova; Olga Michurina; Tatyana Pentukova	7:44:07

=== Individual men ===
Rank	Athlete	Country	Time (h:m:s)
1	Richard Nerurkar	Great Britain (GBR)	2:10:03
2	Severino Bernardini	Italy (ITA)	2:10:12
3	Gemechu Kebede	Ethiopia (ETH)	2:10:16
4	Becho Tadesse	Ethiopia (ETH)	2:10:27
5	Rodrigo Gavela	Spain (ESP)	2:10:27
6	Tumo Turbo	Ethiopia (ETH)	2:10:31
7	Bedaso Turbe	Ethiopia (ETH)	2:10:34
8	Luca Barzaghi	Italy (ITA)	2:10:53
9	Koichi Takahashi	Japan (JPN)	2:10:55
10	Diego Garcia	Spain (ESP)	2:10:58
11	David Buzza	Great Britain (GBR)	2:11:06
12	Fernando Couto	Portugal (POR)	2:11:18
13	Walter Durbano	Italy (ITA)	2:11:36
14	Tesfaye Tafa	Ethiopia (ETH)	2:11:57
15	Raffaello Alliegro	Italy (ITA)	2:12:37
16	Andrew Green	Great Britain (GBR)	2:12:57
17	Dominique Chauvelier	France (FRA)	2:12:58
18	Juvenal Ribeiro	Portugal (POR)	2:13:03
19	Antoni Peña	Spain (ESP)	2:13:06
20	Alberto Juzdado	Spain (ESP)	2:13:09
21	Vladimir Bukhanov	Ukraine (UKR)	2:13:17
22	Lemi Chengere	Ethiopia (ETH)	2:13:26
23	Eduard Tukhbatullin	Russia (RUS)	2:13:28
24	Peter Fleming	Great Britain (GBR)	2:13:33
25	Juan-Carlos Montero	Spain (ESP)	2:13:46
26	Nikolay Tabak	Ukraine (UKR)	2:13:57
27	Viktor Vikhristenko	Ukraine (UKR)	2:13:59
28	Mario Sousa	Portugal (POR)	2:14:07
29	Belayneh Tadesse	Ethiopia (ETH)	2:14:17
30	Andrey Tarasov	Russia (RUS)	2:14:25
31	Martin Grüning	Germany (GER)	2:14:33
32	Johannes Maremane	South Africa (RSA)	2:14:44
33	Vicente Anton	Spain (ESP)	2:14:48
34	Gianluigi Curreli	Italy (ITA)	2:14:54
35	Katsumi Kitajima	Japan (JPN)	2:15:24
36	Manuel Matias	Portugal (POR)	2:15:25
37	Robert Pierce	United States (USA)	2:15:44
38	Bruno Leger	France (FRA)	2:15:45
39	Toshihiro Shibutani	Japan (JPN)	2:15:59
40	Benito Ojeda	Spain (ESP)	2:16:11
41	Joao Pacau	Brazil (BRA)	2:16:22
42	David O'Keeffe	United States (USA)	2:16:22
43	Jean-Baptiste Protais	France (FRA)	2:16:30
44	Nikolay Plykin	Russia (RUS)	2:16:54
45	Victor Costa	Spain (ESP)	2:16:56
46	Jesus de Grado	Spain (ESP)	2:16:56
47	Luis Amarilha	Brazil (BRA)	2:17:31
48	Thabiso Ralekhetla	Lesotho (LES)	2:17:34
49	David Navarro	Spain (ESP)	2:17:55
50	Jacob Ledwaba	South Africa (RSA)	2:18:11
51	Peter Schneider	Switzerland (SUI)	2:18:21
52	Ramon Jausaro	Spain (ESP)	2:18:37
53	James Hage	United States (USA)	2:18:48
54	Cesar Sanchez	Spain (ESP)	2:18:54
55	Vladimir Fomin	Russia (RUS)	2:18:57
56	Boris Batuyev	Belarus (BLR)	2:19:18
57	Moses Matabane	Lesotho (LES)	2:19:22
58	Ricardo Jose Castano	Spain (ESP)	2:19:28
59	Adriano Carvalho	Portugal (POR)	2:19:31
60	Alban Varlet	France (FRA)	2:19:39
61	Sergey Yudenkov	Belarus (BLR)	2:20:09
62	Adam Motlagale	South Africa (RSA)	2:20:24
63	Vladimir Tonchinski	Belarus (BLR)	2:20:40
64	Martin McLoughlin	Great Britain (GBR)	2:21:25
65	Piet Ramudzuli	South Africa (RSA)	2:22:00
67	Uwe Honsdorf	Germany (GER)	2:22:42
71	Brad Hawthorne	United States (USA)	2:23:49
73	Thomas Ertl	Germany (GER)	2:26:14
79	Robert Stolz	United States (USA)	2:34:29
80	Daniel Mbuli	South Africa (RSA)	2:36:13
100?	Michael Alexander	Trinidad and Tobago (TRI)	2:49:59
—	Antonio-Fabián Silio	Argentina (ARG)	DNF

=== Individual women ===
Rank	Athlete	Country	Time (h:m:s)
1	Jun-xia Wang	China (CHN)	2:28:16
2	Lin-li Zhang	China (CHN)	2:29:42
3	Li-rong Zhang	China (CHN)	2:29:45
4	Li-yan Ma	China (CHN)	2:30:44
5	Maria-Luisa Muñoz	Spain (ESP)	2:31:01
6	Monica Pont	Spain (ESP)	2:31:21
7	Rocio Rios	Spain (ESP)	2:31:33
8	Firiya Sultanova	Russia (RUS)	2:33:46
9	Olga Michurina	Russia (RUS)	2:34:31
10	Lynn Harding	Great Britain (GBR)	2:35:04
11	Ornella Ferrara	Italy (ITA)	2:35:08
12	Maria Rebelo	France (FRA)	2:35:37
13	Lorraine Masuoka	United States (USA)	2:35:38
14	Tatyana Pentukova	Russia (RUS)	2:35:50
15	Fatima Neves	Portugal (POR)	2:36:15
16	Isabelle Guillot	France (FRA)	2:36:16
17	Volha Yudenkova	Belarus (BLR)	2:36:25
18	Josefa Cruz	Spain (ESP)	2:36:31
19	Natalia Galushko	Belarus (BLR)	2:37:07
20	Gabriela Wolf	Germany (GER)	2:37:26
21	Danielle Sanderson	Great Britain (GBR)	2:37:33
22	Elisabeth Krieg	Switzerland (SUI)	2:37:40
23	Tammy Slusser	United States (USA)	2:37:41
24	Elena Murgoci	Romania (ROM)	2:37:47
25	Jane Welzel	United States (USA)	2:37:53
26	Andrea Fleischer	Germany (GER)	2:38:06
27	Marie-Helene Ohier	France (FRA)	2:38:47
28	Silvana Cucchietti	Italy (ITA)	2:39:00
29	Aurora Perez	Spain (ESP)	2:39:24
30	Franca Fiacconi	Italy (ITA)	2:40:03
31	Aurica Buia	Romania (ROM)	2:40:04
32	Tatyana Zolotareva	Russia (RUS)	2:40:12
33	Cristina Costea	Romania (ROM)	2:41:40
34	Irina Ruban	Russia (RUS)	2:42:33
35	Isabella Moretti	Switzerland (SUI)	2:42:37
36	Gadisse Edato	Ethiopia (ETH)	2:43:30
37	Laura deWald	United States (USA)	2:43:32
38	Angela Hulley	Great Britain (GBR)	2:43:38
39	Tatyana Titova	Russia (RUS)	2:44:02
40	Alena Vinnitskaya	Belarus (BLR)	2:44:28
41	Adriana Barbu	Romania (ROM)	2:46:40
42	Blanche Moila	South Africa (RSA)	2:47:02
43	Maryse Le Gallo	France (FRA)	2:47:08
44	Gillian Horovitz	Great Britain (GBR)	2:47:14
45	Maria Polyzou	Greece (GRE)	2:48:58
46	Alzira Lario	Portugal (POR)	2:49:08
47	Addis Gezahegne	Ethiopia (ETH)	2:51:52
48	Karen Cornwall	Great Britain (GBR)	2:54:34
49	Jean Rayner	South Africa (RSA)	2:55:01
—	Ann Boyd	United States (USA)	DNF
—	Yun-xia Qu	China (CHN)	DNF
