= 1992 World Junior Championships in Athletics – Women's 3000 metres =

The women's 3000 metres event at the 1992 World Junior Championships in Athletics was held in Seoul, South Korea, at Olympic Stadium on 18 and 20 September.

== Medalists ==
| Gold | Zhang Linli; China |
| Silver | Gabriela Szabo; Romania |
| Bronze | Zhang Lirong; China |

== Results ==
=== Final ===
20 September

| Rank | Name | Nationality | Time | Notes |
|---|---|---|---|---|
| 1st place, gold medalist(s) | Zhang Linli | China | 8:46.86 | |
| 2nd place, silver medalist(s) | Gabriela Szabo | Romania | 8:48.28 | |
| 3rd place, bronze medalist(s) | Zhang Lirong | China | 8:48.45 | |
| 4 | Paula Radcliffe | United Kingdom | 8:51.78 | |
| 5 | Annemari Sandell | Finland | 8:56.02 | |
| 6 | Emebet Shiferaw | Ethiopia | 9:00.05 | |
| 7 | Jeong Yeong-Im | South Korea | 9:00.30 | |
| 8 | Susie Power | Australia | 9:04.30 | |
| 9 | Anja Smolders | Belgium | 9:08.65 | |
| 10 | Azumi Miyazaki | Japan | 9:10.15 | |
| 11 | Friederike Schmidt | Germany | 9:18.44 | |
| 12 | Mónika Tóth | Hungary | 9:20.83 | |

=== Heats ===
18 September

==== Heat 1 ====
| Rank | Name | Nationality | Time | Notes |
|---|---|---|---|---|
| 1 | Zhang Lirong | China | 9:05.02 | Q |
| 2 | Gabriela Szabo | Romania | 9:08.59 | Q |
| 3 | Anja Smolders | Belgium | 9:08.71 | Q |
| 4 | Jeong Yeong-Im | South Korea | 9:08.79 | Q |
| 5 | Annemari Sandell | Finland | 9:09.42 | q |
| 6 | Yuko Kubota | Japan | 9:19.54 | |
| 7 | Yelena Zhilkina | Commonwealth of Independent States | 9:29.38 | |
| 8 | Lydia Tanui | Kenya | 9:34.53 | |
| 9 | Ana Isabel Gimeno | Spain | 9:39.86 | |
| 10 | Andrea Karhoff | Germany | 10:04.31 | |
| 11 | Tuelo Setswamorago | Botswana | 10:59.39 | |

==== Heat 2 ====
| Rank | Name | Nationality | Time | Notes |
|---|---|---|---|---|
| 1 | Emebet Shiferaw | Ethiopia | 9:08.62 | Q |
| 2 | Paula Radcliffe | United Kingdom | 9:10.77 | Q |
| 3 | Susie Power | Australia | 9:11.52 | Q |
| 4 | Zhang Linli | China | 9:11.67 | Q |
| 5 | Friederike Schmidt | Germany | 9:11.89 | q |
| 6 | Azumi Miyazaki | Japan | 9:17.03 | q |
| 7 | Mónika Tóth | Hungary | 9:17.05 | q |
| 8 | Kathy Butler | Canada | 9:29.39 | |
| 9 | Kalekye Mutavi | Kenya | 9:35.90 | |
| 10 | Jenny Hopkinson | New Zealand | 10:09.06 | |

== Participation ==
According to an unofficial count, 21 athletes from 17 countries participated in the event.

- Australia (1)
- Belgium (1)
- Botswana (1)
- Canada (1)
- China (2)
- Commonwealth of Independent States (1)
- Ethiopia (1)
- Finland (1)
- Germany (2)
- Hungary (1)
- Japan (2)
- Kenya (2)
- New Zealand (1)
- Romania (1)
- South Korea (1)
- Spain (1)
- United Kingdom (1)
