= Hasetsune Cup =

Annual ultramarathon in Japan

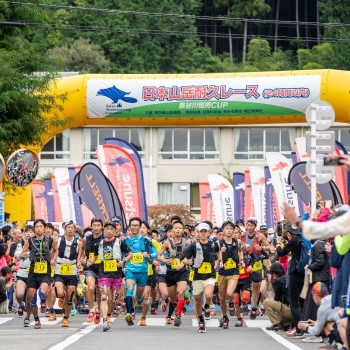
- Date: October
- Location: Tokyo, Japan
- Event type: Trail running
- Distance: 71.5 kilometres (44.4 miles)
- Established: 1992
- Website: Hasetsune Cup

The Hasetsune Cup (ハセツネ, hasetsune), also referred to as The Japan Mountain Endurance Race (日本山岳耐久レース), or Hasegawa Tsuneo Cup (長谷川恒男カップ), is an annual ultramarathon sporting event held since 1992 in the mountain area in Tokyo, Japan to commemorate a Japanese alpinist, Tsuneo Hasegawa (長谷川恒男).

The distance of the race is 71.5 kilometres (44.4 miles), the cumulative altitude gain is 4,582m, and the time limit is 24 hours. Men's course record is 7:19:13 achieved by Toru Higashi (東 徹) in 2013, and ladies' course record is 8:54:07 achieved by Norimi Sakurai (櫻井教実) in 2008.

== Results ==
=== 2013 ===
2,127 finishers out of 2,579 starters (2,852 entries).
Men

1. Toru Higashi (東 徹) 7:19:13 Course Record
2. Tetsuya Osugi (大杉 哲也) 7:29:05
3. Satoshi Okuyama (奥山 聡) 7:36:21

Ladies

1. Yumiko Oishi (大石 由美子) 9:26:55
2. Mitsuko Sato (佐藤 光子) 9:40:7
3. Amy Sproston, 9:44:47

=== 2012 ===
1,984 finishers out of 2,344 starters (2,574 entries).
Men

1. Dakota Jones, 7:22:07
2. Toshihito Kondo (近藤 敬仁), 7:40:18
3. Kei Kikushima (菊嶋 啓), 7:53:48

Ladies

1. Mitsuko Sato (佐藤 光子), 9:25:49
2. Ryoko Eda (江田 良子), 9:32:30
3. Yukari Nishida (西田 由香), 9:56:57

=== 2011 ===
1,725 finishers out of 2,158 starters (2,488 entries).
Men

1. Tsuyoshi Soma (相馬 剛), 7:37:18

Ladies

1. Yumiko Oishi (大石 由美子), 9:49:03

=== 2010 ===
1,622 finishers out of 2,232 starters (2,504 entries).
Men

1. Ludwig Pommelet, 8:03:02

Ladies

1. Yasuko Nomura (野村 泰子), 9:45:24

=== 2009 ===
1,727 finishers out of 2,070 starters (2,256 entries).
Men

1. Yutaka Goto (後藤 豊), 7:31:48

Ladies

1. Midori Hoshino (星野 緑), 10:10:22
