= 100K run world record progression =

The following tables show the List of world records in athletics progression in the 100K run, as recognised by World Athletics. The 100K run was introduced as a world record event in January 2004.

== World record progression ==
=== Key to tables ===
Awaiting ratification not ratified or later rescinded by World Athletics

=== Men ===
Time	Athlete	Date	Place	Ref
6:13:33	Takahiro Sunada (JPN)	1998-06-21	Yūbetsu, Japan	
6:09:14	Nao Kazami (JPN)	2018-06-24	Yūbetsu, Japan	
6:05:35	Aleksandr Sorokin (LIT)	2023-05-14	Vilnius, Lithuania	
5:59:20	Sibusiso Kubheka (RSA)	2025-08-26	Nardò Ring, Italy	

=== Women ===
==== Women only race ====
Time	Athlete	Date	Place	Ref

==== Mixed gender race ====
Time	Athlete	Date	Place	Ref
6:33:11	Tomoe Abe (JPN)	2000-06-25	Yūbetsu, Japan	

== See also ==
- Ultramarathon
- IAU 100 km World Championships
