= Silvermine Bay Ferry Pier =

Ferry pier in Lantau Island, Hong Kong

Silvermine Bay Ferry Pier 梅窩渡輪碼頭
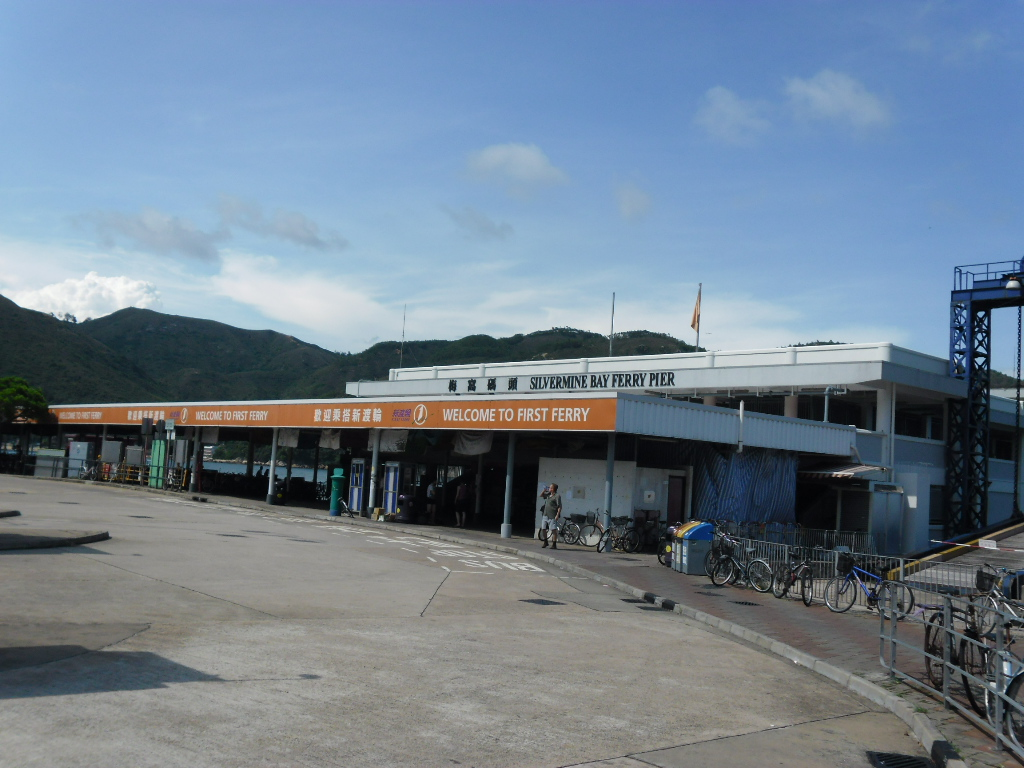
- Silvermine Bay Ferry Pier
- Location: Mui Wo Ferry Pier Road, Mui Wo
- Coordinates: 22.26509°N 114.00234°E
- Operator: Transport Department
- Maintained by: Civil Engineering and Development Department

Characteristics
- ID number: IP065

History
- Opening date: 24 May 1980; 46 years ago

Silvermine Bay Ferry Pier
- Traditional Chinese: 梅窩渡輪碼頭
- Simplified Chinese: 梅窝渡轮码头
Transcriptions
Standard Mandarin
- Hanyu Pinyin: Méiwō Dùlún Mǎtóu
Yue: Cantonese
- Yale Romanization: Múi wō douh lèuhn máh tàuh
- Jyutping: Mui4 wo1 dou6 leon4 maa5 tau4

Silvermine Bay Ferry Pier or Mui Wo Ferry Pier is a ferry pier located on the waterfront of Silver Mine Bay in Mui Wo Ferry Pier Road, Mui Wo, New Territories, Hong Kong. There are two ferry routes provided in the pier. One is the service between Mui Wo and Central, operated by Sun Ferry. Another one is the "Inter-Island" service among Peng Chau, Lantau Island (Mui Wo, Chi Ma Wan) and Cheung Chau, also operated by the same operator.

== History ==
Before the war, although the population in Mui Wo had increased, it was still geographically isolated. Few people in Mui Wo had visited Hong Kong Island and only took the kai-to to Cheung Chau several times a year to buy daily necessities. Until the establishment of Hongkong and Yaumati Ferry, the ferry only went from Hong Kong Island to Cheung Chau. To leave Hong Kong Island, people in Mui Wo had to take a kai ferry to Cheung Chau and then ferry to Hong Kong Island. In 1945, the ferry company finally opened a route to Mui Wo. Although there was only one flight per day and there was no dock, passengers had to transfer to the shore by barge near the center of Mui Wo Sea as the waterway was finally opened.

After the war, a lot of migrants flocked to Mui Wo to rent land and build houses from the villagers. By the 1950s, the ferry frequency increased successively, and the villagers also began to prepare for the construction of a pier. In October 1977, the government spent HK$10 million to rebuild the Silvermine Bay Pier. The new Silvermine Bay Ferry Terminal was opened on 24 May 1980, and was officially opened by Hongkong and Yaumati Ferry General Manager Lau Chan Kwok, Kenneth Fung and Lee Pak Yiu, General Manager Liu Ding Zhong, Deputy General Manager Young Tsin Kiu and government officials.

In the past, Silvermine Bay Ferry Pier was an important transportation hub for Mui Wo and the entire Lantau Island. The public had to take a ferry from the Central Ferry Pier to Mui Wo, and then transfer to the New Lantao Bus to destinations such as the Tian Tan Buddha and Tai O. Therefore, the pier was not crowded with tourists especially on holidays.

Until 1997, when the Lantau Link opened as well as the MTR Tung Chung line being opened to traffic in 1998 and the Tuen Mun–Chek Lap Kok Link being opened to traffic in 2020, the public can take a bus or MTR to Tung Chung station to take the bus to all parts of Lantau Island (including Mui Wo), there is no need to take the ferry to Central, so the usage of the pier had dropped drastically.
