= Walter Durbano =

Italian long-distance runner

Personal information
- Nationality: Italian
- Born: 31 May 1963 (age 63)

Sport
- Country: Italy
- Sport: Athletics
- Event(s): Long-distance running Marathon

Achievements and titles
- Personal best: Marathon: 2:11:13 (1993)
Medal record
World Marathon Cup
| Silver medal – second place | 1993 San Sebastián | Team |

Walter Durbano (born 31 May 1963) is a former Italian male long-distance runner who competed at two editions of the IAAF World Cross Country Championships at senior level (1990, 1994). In 1991 he won the Turin Marathon (Maratona di Torino) in 2:10.03.
