= Tenerife Bluetrail =

Ultramarathon race in Tenerife, Spain

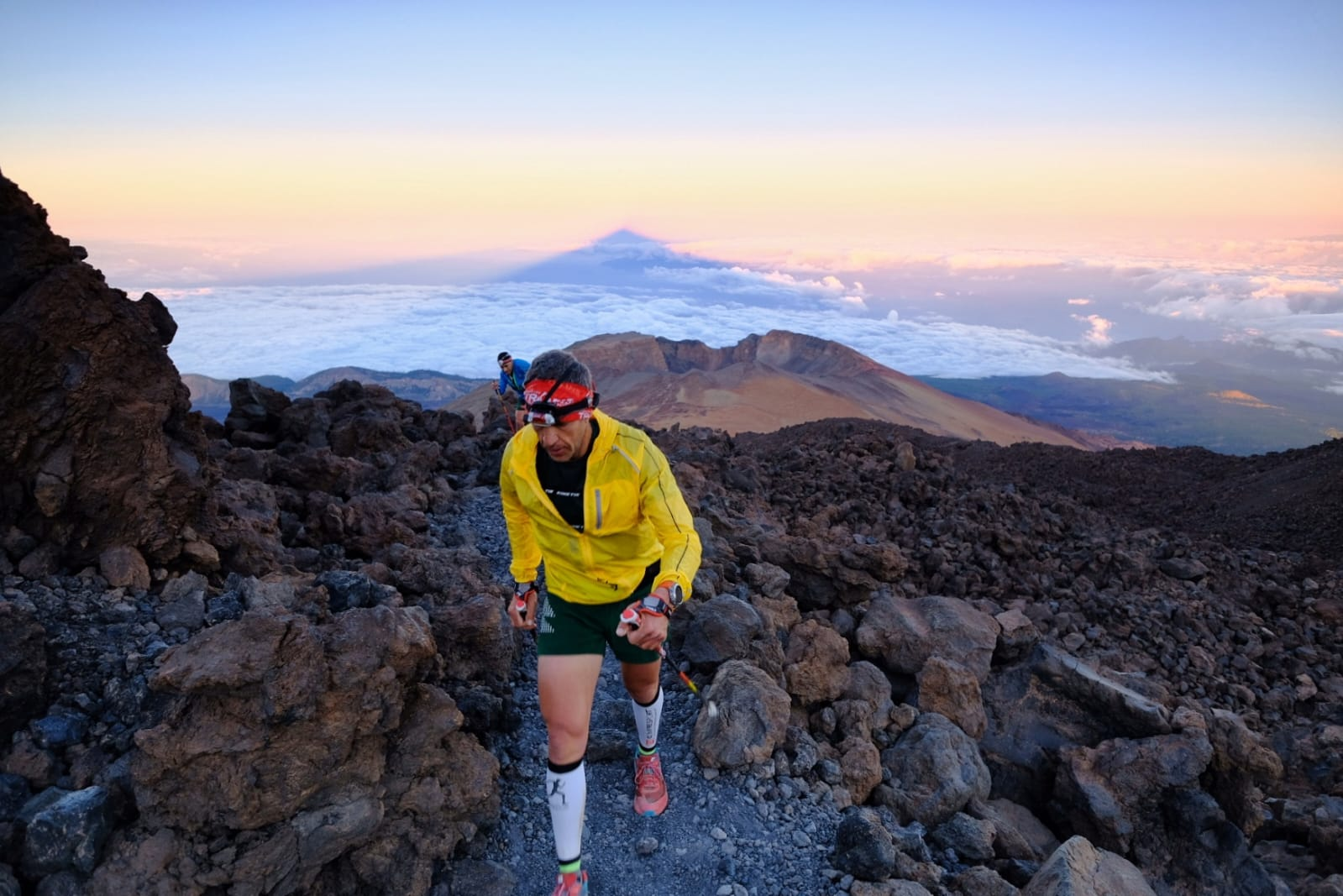
Tenerife Bluetrail

The Tenerife Bluetrail is an annual mountain trail running event held on the island of Tenerife, Spain. Considered one of the country's most prestigious trail ultramarathons, it offers multiple race distances including specialized courses for athletes with disabilities and is renowned for its extreme elevation gain and unique geographical location in Macaronesia, off the coast of Africa.

It is the highest race in Spain, crossing the Teide National Park at 3,555 meters and attracts runners from different parts of the country and around the world.

== Race categories ==
The circuit offers five categories: Ultra (102 km), Trail (66 km), Marathon (43 km), Media (21 km) and Reto Bluetrail.

== 2026 cancellation ==
The 2026 edition of the Tenerife Bluetrail, originally scheduled for March 19–21, was cancelled due to the impact of Storm Therese. The decision followed the Tenerife Island Council's activation of the Island Emergency Plan on March 17, in response to red weather alerts for 100 km/h winds and heavy snowfall. The suspension affected over 3,400 registered runners from 64 countries.

== Featured runners ==
- Sangé Sherpa (Nepal, 1981), winner of the Cajamar Tenerife Bluetrail of 2016.
- María Lorena Ramírez (Mexico, 1995), background runner of the Rarámuri ethnic group.
