= Zhang Linli =

Chinese long-distance runner

Medal record

Women's athletics

Representing China

Asian Championships
Silver medal – second place	1993 Manila	3000 m

Zhang Linli (Chinese: 张林丽; born 6 March 1973 in Shenyang) is a retired Chinese long-distance runner who set world class times in events ranging from 1500 metres up to the marathon. She broke the world record in the women's 3000 metres on 12 September 1993.

== International competitions ==
Year	Competition	Venue	Position	Event	Notes
Representing China
1992	World Junior Championships	Seoul, South Korea	1st	3000 m	8:46.86
1993	World Championships	Stuttgart, Germany	2nd	3000 m	8:29.25
1993	East Asian Games	Shanghai, China	2nd	3000 m	8:44.82
1993	IAAF World Marathon Cup	San Sebastián, Spain	2nd	Marathon	2:29.42
1993	Asian Championships	Manila, Philippines	2nd	3000 m	9:16.19
1994	Asian Games	Hiroshima, Japan	1st	3000 m	8:52.97

== Personal bests ==
Distance	Performance	Date	Location
1500 m	3:57.46	11 September 1993	Beijing
3000 m	8:16.50	13 September 1993	Beijing
10,000 m	31:16.28	8 September 1993	Beijing
Marathon	2:24:42	4 April 1993	Tianjin

== See also ==
- China at the World Championships in Athletics

Records
Preceded by Tatyana Kazankina	woman's 3,000 m World Record Holder; 12 September 1993 — 12 September 1993	Succeeded by Wang Junxia
