= Zhang Lirong =

Chinese runner

Medal record

Women's athletics

Representing China

Asian Championships
Silver medal – second place	1993 Manila	10,000 m

Zhang Lirong (born 3 March 1973) is a retired Chinese runner. A dynamic middle and long distance runner, she set world class times in events ranging from the 1500m all the way up the marathon. She won the bronze medal in the 3000 m at the 1993 World Championships in Stuttgart.

== Achievements ==
Year	Competition	Venue	Position	Event	Notes
Representing China
1992	World Junior Championships	Seoul, South Korea	3rd	3000 m	8:48.45
1993	World Championships	Stuttgart, Germany	3rd	3000 m	8:31.95
1993	East Asian Games	Shanghai, China	1st	3000 m	8:40.30
1993	Asian Championships	Manila, Philippines	2nd	10,000 m	35:28.99
1993	World Marathon Cup	San Sebastián, Spain	3rd	Marathon	2:29.45
1994	Asian Games	Hiroshima, Japan	2nd	Marathon	2:36:27

== Personal bests ==
Distance	Performance	Date	Location
1500 m	3:59.70	11 September 1993	Beijing
3000 m	8:21.84	13 September 1993	Beijing
10,000 m	31:09.25	8 September 1993	Beijing
Marathon	2:24:52	4 April 1993	Tianjin

== See also ==
- China at the World Championships in Athletics
