= Ultramarathon =

Footrace longer than the marathon

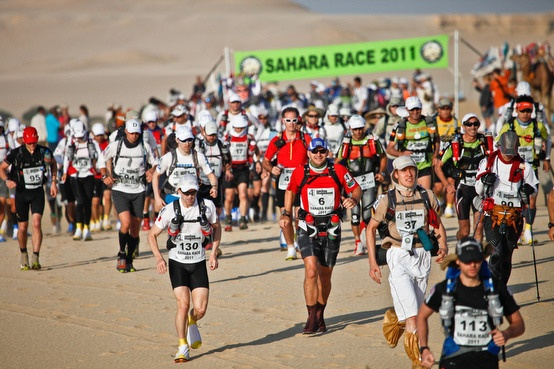
- Ultramarathoners compete at the Sahara Race 2011 (4 Deserts)
- Highest governing body: World Athletics; International Association of Ultrarunners; Global Organization of Multi-Day Ultramarathoners; International Trail Running Association

Presence
- World Championships: 1987–present

An ultramarathon is a footrace longer than the traditional marathon distance of 42.195 kilometres (26 mi 385 yd). The sport of running ultramarathons is called ultra running or ultra distance running.

Various distances, surfaces, and formats are raced competitively. The shortest common ultramarathon is 31 miles (50 km), and 100 miles (160 km) is typically the longest course distance raced in under 24 hours, but there are also longer multi-day races commonly held as 48 hours, 200 miles (320 km), or more, sometimes raced in stages with breaks for sleep.

The oldest and largest ultramarathons are held on roads, including the Comrades Marathon (more than 10,000 finishers annually) and Two Oceans Marathon (more than 6,000 finishers annually). Many ultramarathons have historical significance, including the Spartathlon, based on the 246 km run of Greek messenger Pheidippides from Athens to Sparta during the Battle of Marathon in a day and a half to seek aid against the Persians.

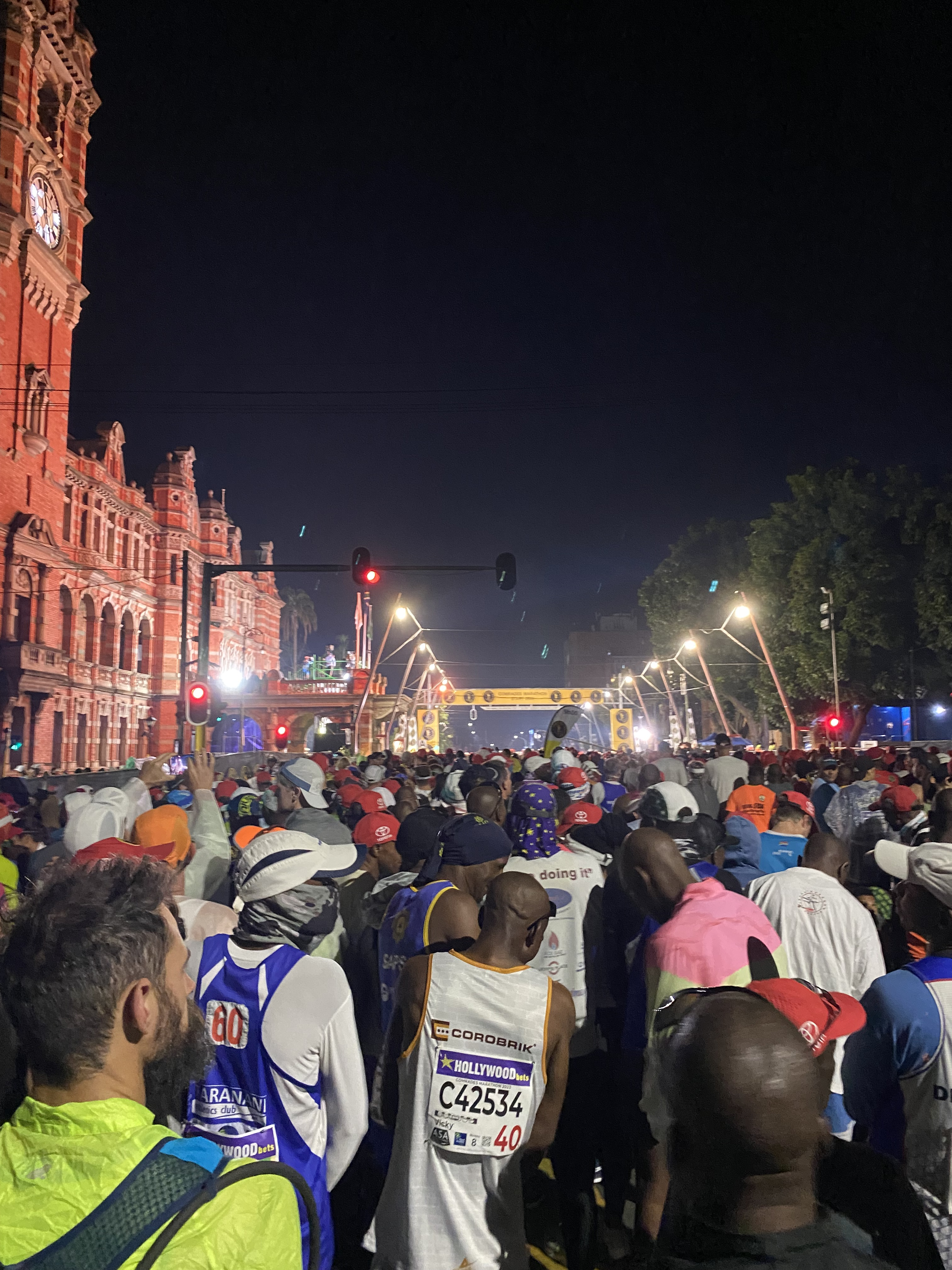
Runners waiting for the start of the 2023 Comrades Marathon

Ultra running World Championships are held by the International Association of Ultrarunners (IAU) for 50 km, 100 km and 24 hours. The Global Organization of Multi-Day Ultramarathoners (GOMU) holds World Championships for 48 hours and six days. World records are ratified and recognized by World Athletics (50 km and 100 km), the IAU (50 km up to six days), and by GOMU (48 hours up to 5000 km).

Ultramarathons also overlap with the sports of trail running and mountain running. Some 100-mile (160 km) races are among the oldest and most prestigious events, especially in North America. The oldest and also the largest trail race is the SainteLyon 78-kilometre (48 mi) in France (more than 5,000 finishers annually). Many ultramarathon organizers are members of the International Trail Running Association (ITRA), an organization that evaluates the difficulty of specific ultramarathon routes according to a number of criteria, such as the distance, the cumulative elevation gain, and the number of loops and stages.

== Overview ==
There are two main types of ultramarathon events: those that cover a specified distance or route, and those that last for a predetermined period (with the winner covering the most distance in that time). Outliers are events like Backyard ultras which do not have a predetermined distance or time limit. The most common distances are 50 kilometres (31.07 mi), 50 miles (80.47 km), 100 kilometres (62.14 mi), 100 miles (160.93 km), and continue up to the longest certified race distance of 3100 miles. Timed events range from 6, 12, and 24 hours to 3, 6, and 10 days (known as multiday races). Timed events are generally run on a track or a short road course, often one mile (1.6 km) or less.

The format of ultramarathons and the courses vary, ranging from single loops (some as short as a 400-metre (1,300 ft) track), to point-to-point road or trail races, to cross-country rogaines. Many ultramarathons have significant obstacles, such as inclement weather, elevation change, or rugged terrain. Usually, there are aid stations, whether every lap of a track, small road or trail loop courses, or extending up to perhaps 20 to 35 kilometres (12 to 22 mi), where runners can replenish food and drink or take a short break.

There are some self-supported ultramarathon stage races in which each competitor has to carry all their supplies including food to survive the length of the race, typically a week long. The Marathon des Sables 6-day stage race in Morocco and the Grand to Grand Ultra in the U.S. are examples. Free community events such as Fat Ass races may also require competitors to bring their own supplies, but as a consequence of the race having minimal formal organisation, rather than as part of the challenge.

The International Association of Ultrarunners (IAU) organises the World Championships for various ultramarathon distances, including 50 kilometres (31 mi), 100 kilometres (62 mi), 24 hours, and ultra trail running, which are also recognized by World Athletics. Many countries around the world have their own ultrarunning organizations, often the national athletics federation of the country, or are sanctioned by such national athletics organizations.

50-kilometer and 100-kilometer races are recognized as World Records by World Athletics, the world governing body of track and field. The International Association of Ultrarunners recognizes IAU World Records for 50-kilometers, 100-kilometers, 6 hours, 12 hours, 100 miles, 24 hours, 48 hours, and 6 days.

There are ultramarathon racewalking events that are usually 50 km, although 100 km and 100-mile (160 km) "Centurion" races are also organized. Furthermore, the non-competitive International Marching League event Nijmegen Four Days March has a regulation distance of 4 × 50 km over four days for those aged 19 to 49.

In 2021, concerns were raised about planning and medical care available for ultramarathons in China, after 21 racers died from hypothermia while competing in an ultramarathon in the Yellow River Stone Forest. The government later announced a ban on "extreme" competitions.

In August 2023, a partnership between Ultra-Trail du Mont-Blanc (UTMB) and Ironman Triathlon was announced and the new formation of the UTMB World Series, an ultra-distance circuit that culminates with UTMB held in August. Concerns have been raised about rising entry fees, homogenization of racing experiences, and bulldozing of smaller events.

== IAU World Record and World Best performances ==
Until 2014, the IAU maintained lists of the world best performances on different surfaces (road, track, and indoor). Starting in 2015, the distinction between the surfaces was removed and the records were combined into a single category. Some governing bodies continue to keep separate ultramarathon track and road records for their jurisdictions.

Starting in January 2022, the IAU began to recognize and ratify performances as IAU World Records. World Athletics also began to ratify the 50k distance as a World Record for both mixed and women, respectively, along with 100k. The events considered IAU World Records are: 6, 12, 24, and 48 hours along with 50 and 100 miles. Records in the 6 day event are called World Best Performances by the IAU.

Performances exceeding the current IAU records but which have not yet been ratified include the following:

- Ivan Zaborsky ran 1047.554 km in six days in Vallon Pont d'Arc, France, finishing on 4 May 2025. However, he broke a rule by displaying the Russian flag instead of following the regulations for neutral athletes.
- Megan Eckert ran 970.685 km in six days at the same race in Vallon Pont d'Arc in 2025, breaking the six-day women’s world record.
- Sibusiso Kubheka ran 100 km in 5:59:20 in August 2025 but the performance was not eligible to be a world record due to the footwear not satisfying competition requirements, among other reasons.
- Caitriona Jennings ran the Tunnel Hill 100 Mile race in 12:37:04 in November 2025.
- Ashley Paulson ran 100 miles in 12:19:34 at the Jackpot 100 Mile in February 2026.
- Satu Lipiäinen ran 85.712 km in six hours at the Kokkola Ultra Run in May 2026.
- In September 2026 Megan Eckert won the Global Organization of Multi-Day Ultramarathoners Six-Day World Championship with a run of 636.482 miles; this surpassed the six-day women’s world record and the six-day American men’s record.

The IAU World Records and World Best Performances as of May 2026 are as follows.

=== Men ===
Event	Record	Athlete	Date	Place
50 km	2:38:43	CJ Albertson (USA)	8 October 2022	(United States) San Francisco, US
50 miles	4:48:21	Charles R. Lawrence (USA)	11 November 2023	(United States) Vienna, IL, US
100 km	6:05:35	Aleksandr Sorokin (LTU)	14 May 2023	Vilnius, Lithuania
100 miles	10:51:39	Aleksandr Sorokin (LTU)	7 January 2022	Tel Aviv, Israel
6 hours	98.496 km	Aleksandr Sorokin (LTU)	23 April 2022	(United Kingdom) Bedford, UK
12 hours	177.410 km	Aleksandr Sorokin (LTU)	7 January 2022	Tel Aviv, Israel
24 hours	319.614 km	Aleksandr Sorokin (LTU)	17 September 2022	Verona, Italy
48 hours	485.099 km	Matthieu Bonne (BEL)	30 May–1 Jun 2025	Pabianice, Poland
6 days	1045.519 km	Matthieu Bonne (BEL)	5–11 September 2024	Balatonfüred, Hungary

=== Women ===
Event	Record	Athlete	Date	Place
50 km	2:59:54	Desiree Linden (USA)	13 April 2021	Dorena, Oregon, United States
50 miles	5:18:57	Anne Flower (USA)	9 November 2025	(United States) Vienna, IL, US
100 km	6:33:11	Tomoe Abe (JPN)	25 June 2000	Yubetsu-Saroma-Tokoro, Japan
100 miles	12:42:40	Camille Herron (USA)	11 November 2017	(United States) Vienna, IL, US
6 hours	85.492 km	Nele Alder-Baerens (GER)	11 March 2017	Münster, Germany
12 hours	153.600 km	Satu Lipiäinen (FIN)	20 May 2023	Kokkola, Finland
24 hours	278.621 km	Sarah Webster (GBR)	18 October 2025	Albi, France
48 hours	436.371 km	Patrycja Bereznowska (POL)	30 May–1 Jun 2025	Pabianice, Poland
6 days	928.577 km	Stine Rex (DEN)	31 Aug–10 Sep 2025	Aabybro, Denmark

=== Former events ===
Until 2021, the IAU also kept records for 1000 km and 1000 miles. The final records were:

==== Men ====
Event	Record	Athlete	Date	Place
1000 km	5d 16:17:00	Yiannis Kouros (GRE)	26 November–2 December 1984	Colac, Australia
1000 miles	10d 10:30:36	Yiannis Kouros (GRE)	20–30 May 1988	(United States) New York City, US

==== Women ====
Event	Record	Athlete	Date	Place
1000 km	7d 16:08:37	Paula Mairer (AUT)	29 September-6 October 2002	(United States) New York City, US
1000 miles	12d 14:38:40	Sandra Barwick (NZL)	16–28 October 1991	(United States) New York City, US

== IAU World Championships ==
There are four IAU World Championships: the IAU 100 km World Championships, IAU 50 km World Championships, IAU 24 Hour World Championship, and the IAU Trail World Championships.

== Ultramarathons by regions ==
Ultramarathons are run around the world with more than 600,000 people completing them every year.

=== Africa ===
- South Africa hosts a number of notable ultra marathon events.
  - On road: the world's oldest and largest ultramarathon, the 87 kilometres (54 mi) Comrades Marathon. Approximately 12,000 runners complete the Comrades each year, out of approximately 17,000 who start, with 23,961 competing in 2000.
  - The 56-kilometre (35 mi) Two Oceans Marathon in Cape Town in the southern autumn attracts approximately 11,000 runners.
  - The Washie 100 Miler is Africa's oldest 100 mile road race, held in the Eastern Cape since 1977, running from Cathcart to East London.
- The Grand Raid de la Réunion is held annually on Réunion in October, crossing the island over 163 kilometres (101 mi) with an altitude gain of 9,643 metres (31,637 ft). This race attracts 2,350 competitors, with 1,000 runners from overseas.
- The Marathon des Sables is a 6-day stage race which covers 250 kilometres (160 mi) through the Sahara desert in Morocco.
- The Spanish Canary Islands off the African coast are the location of some prestigious ultramarathons, including the 46-mile Transvulcania.

=== Asia ===
Ultrarunning has become popular in Asia, and countries such as Japan, Taiwan, and South Korea have hosted IAU World Championships.

- In Israel, two major ultramarathon races are Mount to Valley relay race, over 215 km, from the hills of the Upper Galilee to the Jezreel Valley; and the Valley Circle race in the Jezreel valley, containing several distances, including 160 km and 200 km.
- India's first ultra-marathon, the Bangalore Ultra, was held in 2007. Since 2010, the Indian Himalayas have hosted La Ultra – The High, a 333 km course crossing Khardung La, touted to be the world's highest motorable mountain pass.
- Japan had its first 100 km event in 1987 as Lake Saroma Ultramarathon and hosted the IAU 100 km World Championship in 1994 (Lake Saroma), 1998 (River Shimanto) and 2005 (Lake Saroma). Japan hosts more than 50 ultramarathon events throughout the year, including the Trans Japan Alps Race (TJAR) (415 kilometres (258 miles) with more than 26,000 metres (16 miles) cumulative altitude gain crossing Japan Alps, crossing Japan's mainland from Japan Sea to Pacific Ocean in 7 days), Hasetsune cup (71.5 kilometres (44.4 miles) in steep foggy mountains) and the Ultra-Trail Mt. Fuji (161 kilometres (100 miles) loop around World Heritage Mount Fuji with a cumulative altitude gain of about 9,000 metres (5.6 miles)).
- The Gobi March in northwest China was China's first ultramarathon, first staged in 2003. The Gobi March is part of the 4 Deserts Race Series.
- Hong Kong Four Trails Ultra Challenge is a 298 km-long uninterrupted race, the first ultramarathon-class race in Hong Kong.

=== Oceania, Australia, and New Zealand ===
Australia and New Zealand are hosts to some 100 organized ultramarathons each year. Additionally, a handful of runners have run the entire length of New Zealand, a distance of around 2,200 kilometres (1,400 mi).

In Australia, the Westfield Ultra Marathon was an annual race between Sydney and Melbourne contested between 1983 and 1991. Greek runner Yiannis Kouros won the event five times during that period. Australia is also the home of one of the oldest six-day races in the world, the Cliff Young Australian 6-day race, held in Colac, Victoria. The race is held on a 400-meter circuit at the Memorial Square in the centre of Colac and has seen many close races since its inception in 1984. The 20th Cliff Young Australian six-day race was held between 20 and 26 November 2005. During that event, Kouros beat his existing world record six-day track mark and set a new mark of 1,036.851 kilometres (644.269 mi). The Coast to Kosciuszko inaugurated in 2004, is a 246-kilometre (153 mi) marathon from the coast to the top of Mount Kosciuszko, Australia's highest mountain.

Australia has seen a steep growth in ultrarunning events and participants in recent years. Many new races have come into inception, covering a range of ultramarathon distances from 50 km right through to multi-day events. The cornerstone of Australian Ultra events is such races as Ultra-Trail Australia 100, The Great North Walk Ultras, Surf Coast Century, Bogong to Hotham, Alpine Challenge, GC50 Run Festival, and the Cradle Mountain Run. The Australian Ultra Runners Association (AURA) has a comprehensive list and links of events and their respective results.

In New Zealand, the Kepler Challenge is held on a 60 kilometres (37 mi) trail through Fiordland National Park. It has been running since 1988 and is one of the country's most popular races. The Tarawera Ultramarathon is currently one of the most competitive ultras in New Zealand and part of the Ultra-Trail World Tour.

=== Europe ===
The European Ultramarathon Cup is an annual cup event covering some of the biggest ultramarathon races in Europe. The CajaMar Tenerife Bluetrail is the highest race in Spain and second highest in Europe. Besides trail ultramarathons, Europe features large road ultramarathons such as Spartathlon and the Millau 100K, which have gathered thousands of runners for the past 50 years.

The UTMB, through France, Italy, and Switzerland has been considered the world's most competitive trail ultra. The other races in the UTMB festival, including the CCC, TDS, and OCC, are also significant events in the ultrarunning calendar.

=== North America ===
The oldest existing ultramarathon in North America is the JFK 50 Mile, which began in 1963 as a push by President John F. Kennedy to bring the country back to physical fitness.

There are several 100-mile ultramarathons held annually in North America. The Western States Endurance Run is the oldest 100-mile trail run in North America. The race began in 1977, founded by Wendell Robie, of Auburn California.

The first mountain trail ultramarathon held in the United States was the 1911 Mount Baker Race (50K), in Bellingham, Washington. Runners raced by car or train to the trailheads, ran up to the summit of Mount Baker, and then back down to the city.

An early ultramarathon was held in Mexico in 1926, and at the time was part of the Central American Games. Tomas Zafiro and Leoncio San Miguel, both Tarahumara Indians, ran 100 km from Pachuca to Mexico City in 9 hours and 37 minutes. At the time, the Mexican government petitioned to include a 100 km race in the 1928 Summer Olympics in Amsterdam.

In 1928, sports agent C. C. Pyle organized the first of two editions of the 3,455-mile-long Bunion Derby. The first went along U.S. Route 66 from Los Angeles to Chicago before heading toward New York; the 1929 Derby reversed the route. Neither the race nor the accompanying vaudeville show was a financial success.

In the 1980s, Gary "Lazarus Lake" Cantrell and Karl "Raw Dog" Henn conceived the Barkley Marathons, an annual trail race held in March or April in Frozen Head State Park, Tennessee. The course is approximately 20 miles long with approximately 11,000 feet of vertical climb, and runners have 60 hours to complete five laps. The run is notorious not only for its difficulty but also for its secretive nature; entrants must undergo a selection process and entry dates and requirements are not announced, meaning entrants rely on word-of-mouth for details on how to enter. The first Barkley Marathons took place in 1986, and as of 2025, the full, five-loop race has been completed a total of 26 times by 20 runners.

Since 1997, runners have been competing in the Self-Transcendence 3100 Mile Race, which is billed as the longest official footrace in the world. They run 100 laps a day for up to 50 days around a single block in Queens, NY, for a total distance of 3,100 miles (5,000 km). The current record holder is Ashprihanal Pekka Aalto, at 40 days 09:06:21 for a daily average of 76.776 miles (123.559 km) in 2015.

Several 10-day races are also regularly available in the US at venues that hold 6-day races: Across the Years (in Arizona), Sri Chinmoy (in New York) and 6 Days in the Dome (Wisconsin).

In April 2006, the American Ultrarunning Hall of Fame was established by the American Ultrarunning Association (AUA). Candidates for the Hall of Fame are chosen from the 'modern era' of American ultras, beginning with the New York Road Runners Club 30 Mile race held in 1958. The Inaugural inductees were Ted Corbitt, a former US Olympian, winner of the aforementioned race in 3:04:13, and co-founder of the Road Runners Club of America, and Sandra Kiddy, who began her ultra career at age 42 with a world record at 50 kilometers, 3:36:56, and who went on to set a number of American and world ultra records.

The Yukon Arctic Ultra is uniques among ultras for its cold conditions, requiring racers to start from Whitehorse to Dawson City, Yukon, a distance of 430 miles (692 km) in February, with temperatures in the race having fallen as low as -57 degrees celsius.

== See also ==
- 50K run world record progression
- Fastpacking
- Fat Ass
- Fell running
- Skyrunning
- Trail running
- Backyard ultra
