= 1999 World Marathon Cup =

Athletic competition in Seville, Spain

The 1999 World Marathon Cup was the eighth edition of the World Marathon Cup of athletics and were held in Seville, Spain, inside of the 1999 World Championships.

== Results ==
Team men
#	Nations	Time
1	Italy	6:45:16
2	Japan	6:45:42
3	Ethiopia	6:50:11

Team women
#	Nations	Time
1	Japan	7:27:52
2	Romania	7:37:37
3	Germany	7:35:41

Individual men
#	Athlete	Time
1st place, gold medalist(s)	Abel Antón (ESP)	2:13:36
2nd place, silver medalist(s)	Vincenzo Modica (ITA)	2:14:03
3rd place, bronze medalist(s)	Nobuyuki Sato (JPN)	2:14:07
4	Luis Novo (POR)	2:14:27
5	Danilo Goffi (ITA)	2:14:50
6	Atsushi Fujita (JPN)	2:15:45
7	Koji Shimizu (JPN)	2:15:50
8	Martín Fiz (ESP)	2:16:17
9	Simon Biwott (KEN)	2:16:20
10	Daniele Caimmi (ITA)	2:16:23

Individual women
#	Athlete	Time
1st place, gold medalist(s)	Jong Song-Ok (PRK)	2:26:59 NR
2nd place, silver medalist(s)	Ari Ichihashi (JPN)	2:27:02
3rd place, bronze medalist(s)	Lidia Șimon (ROM)	2:27:41
4	Fatuma Roba (ETH)	2:28:04
5	Elfenesh Alemu (ETH)	2:28:52
6	Sonja Krolik (GER)	2:28:55
7	Manuela Machado (POR)	2:29:11
8	Kayoko Obata (JPN)	2:29:11
9	Claudia Dreher (GER)	2:29:22
10	Kim Chang-Ok (PRK)	2:29:26

== See also ==
- 1999 World Championships in Athletics – Men's Marathon
- 1999 World Championships in Athletics – Women's Marathon
