= List of World Athletics Championships medalists (women) =

Women have contested events at the World Athletics Championships since its inauguration in 1983. The top three athletes in each event win gold, silver and bronze medals, respectively. A one-off edition of the championships was also held the same year at the 1980 Summer Olympics to include the IAAF-approved international women's events in 400 metres hurdles and 3000 metres which were not added to the Olympic athletics programme that year due to a dispute with the International Olympic Committee.

== Track ==
=== 100 m ===
Championships	Gold	Silver	Bronze
1983 Helsinki	Marlies Oelsner-Göhr (GDR)	Marita Koch (GDR)	Diane Williams (USA)
1987 Rome	Silke Gladisch-Möller (GDR)	Heike Daute-Drechsler (GDR)	Merlene Ottey (JAM)
1991 Tokyo	Katrin Krabbe (GER)	Gwen Torrence (USA)	Merlene Ottey (JAM)
1993 Stuttgart	Gail Devers (USA)	Merlene Ottey (JAM)	Gwen Torrence (USA)
1995 Gothenburg	Gwen Torrence (USA)	Merlene Ottey (JAM)	Irina Privalova (RUS)
1997 Athens	Marion Jones (USA)	Zhanna Pintusevich (UKR)	Savatheda Fynes (BAH)
1999 Seville	Marion Jones (USA)	Inger Miller (USA)	Ekaterini Thanou (GRE)
2001 Edmonton	Zhanna Pintusevich-Block (UKR)	Ekaterini Thanou (GRE)	Chandra Sturrup (BAH)
2003 Saint-Denis	Torri Edwards (USA)	Chandra Sturrup (BAH)	Ekaterini Thanou (GRE)
2005 Helsinki	Lauryn Williams (USA)	Veronica Campbell (JAM)	Christine Arron (FRA)
2007 Osaka	Veronica Campbell-Brown (JAM)	Lauryn Williams (USA)	Carmelita Jeter (USA)
2009 Berlin	Shelly-Ann Fraser (JAM)	Kerron Stewart (JAM)	Carmelita Jeter (USA)
2011 Daegu	Carmelita Jeter (USA)	Veronica Campbell-Brown (JAM)	Kelly-Ann Baptiste (TRI)
2013 Moscow	Shelly-Ann Fraser-Pryce (JAM)	Murielle Ahouré (CIV)	Carmelita Jeter (USA)
2015 Beijing	Shelly-Ann Fraser-Pryce (JAM)	Dafne Schippers (NED)	Tori Bowie (USA)
2017 London	Tori Bowie (USA)	Marie-Josée Ta Lou (CIV)	Dafne Schippers (NED)
2019 Doha	Shelly-Ann Fraser-Pryce (JAM)	Dina Asher-Smith (GBR)	Marie-Josée Ta Lou (CIV)
2022 Eugene	Shelly-Ann Fraser-Pryce (JAM)	Shericka Jackson (JAM)	Elaine Thompson-Herah (JAM)
2023 Budapest	Sha'Carri Richardson (USA)	Shericka Jackson (JAM)	Shelly-Ann Fraser-Pryce (JAM)
2025 Tokyo	Melissa Jefferson-Wooden (USA)	Tina Clayton (JAM)	Julien Alfred (LCA)

==== Medalists by country ====
Rank	Nation	Gold	Silver	Bronze	Total
1	United States (USA)	10	3	6	19
2	Jamaica (JAM)	6	8	4	18
3	East Germany (GDR)	2	2	0	4
4	Ukraine (UKR)	1	1	0	2
5	Germany (GER)	1	0	0	1
6	Ivory Coast (CIV)	0	2	1	3
7	Bahamas (BAH)	0	1	2	3
7	Greece (GRE)	0	1	2	3
9	Netherlands (NED)	0	1	1	2
10	Great Britain (GBR)	0	1	0	1
11	France (FRA)	0	0	1	1
11	Russia (RUS)	0	0	1	1
11	Saint Lucia (LCA)	0	0	1	1
11	Trinidad and Tobago (TRI)	0	0	1	1

=== 200 m ===
Championships	Gold	Silver	Bronze
1983 Helsinki	Marita Koch (GDR)	Merlene Ottey (JAM)	Kathy Smallwood-Cook (GBR)
1987 Rome	Silke Gladisch (GDR)	Florence Griffith-Joyner (USA)	Merlene Ottey (JAM)
1991 Tokyo	Katrin Krabbe (GER)	Gwen Torrence (USA)	Merlene Ottey (JAM)
1993 Stuttgart	Merlene Ottey (JAM)	Gwen Torrence (USA)	Irina Privalova (RUS)
1995 Gothenburg	Merlene Ottey (JAM)	Irina Privalova (RUS)	Galina Malchugina (RUS)
1997 Athens	Zhanna Pintusevich-Block (UKR)	Susanthika Jayasinghe (SRI)	Merlene Ottey (JAM)
1999 Seville	Inger Miller (USA)	Beverly McDonald (JAM)	Merlene Frazer (JAM) Andrea Philipp (GER)
2001 Edmonton	Debbie Ferguson (BAH)	LaTasha Jenkins (USA)	Cydonie Mothersille (CAY)
2003 Saint-Denis	Anastasiya Kapachinskaya (RUS)	Torri Edwards (USA)	Muriel Hurtis (FRA)
2005 Helsinki	Allyson Felix (USA)	Rachelle Boone-Smith (USA)	Christine Arron (FRA)
2007 Osaka	Allyson Felix (USA)	Veronica Campbell (JAM)	Susanthika Jayasinghe (SRI)
2009 Berlin	Allyson Felix (USA)	Veronica Campbell-Brown (JAM)	Debbie Ferguson-McKenzie (BAH)
2011 Daegu	Veronica Campbell-Brown (JAM)	Carmelita Jeter (USA)	Allyson Felix (USA)
2013 Moscow	Shelly-Ann Fraser-Pryce (JAM)	Murielle Ahouré (CIV)	Blessing Okagbare (NGR)
2015 Beijing	Dafne Schippers (NED)	Elaine Thompson-Herah (JAM)	Veronica Campbell-Brown (JAM)
2017 London	Dafne Schippers (NED)	Marie-Josée Ta Lou (CIV)	Shaunae Miller-Uibo (BAH)
2019 Doha	Dina Asher-Smith (GBR)	Brittany Brown (USA)	Mujinga Kambundji (SUI)
2022 Eugene	Shericka Jackson (JAM)	Shelly-Ann Fraser-Pryce (JAM)	Dina Asher-Smith (GBR)
2023 Budapest	Shericka Jackson (JAM)	Gabrielle Thomas (USA)	Sha'Carri Richardson (USA)
2025 Tokyo	Melissa Jefferson-Wooden (USA)	Amy Hunt (GBR)	Shericka Jackson (JAM)

==== Medalists by country ====
Rank	Nation	Gold	Silver	Bronze	Total
1	Jamaica (JAM)	6	6	6	18
2	United States (USA)	5	9	2	16
3	East Germany (GDR)	2	0	0	2
3	Netherlands (NED)	2	0	0	2
5	Russia (RUS)	1	1	2	4
5	Great Britain (GBR)	1	1	2	4
7	Bahamas (BAH)	1	0	2	3
8	Germany (GER)	1	0	1	2
9	Ukraine (UKR)	1	0	0	1
10	Ivory Coast (CIV)	0	2	0	2
11	Sri Lanka (SRI)	0	1	1	2
12	France (FRA)	0	0	2	2
13	Cayman Islands (CAY)	0	0	1	1
13	Switzerland (SUI)	0	0	1	1
13	Nigeria (NGR)	0	0	1	1

=== 400 m ===
Championships	Gold	Silver	Bronze
1983 Helsinki	Jarmila Kratochvílová (TCH)	Taťána Kocembová (TCH)	Mariya Pinigina (URS)
1987 Rome	Olga Bryzgina (URS)	Petra Muller (GDR)	Kirsten Emmelmann (GDR)
1991 Tokyo	Marie-José Pérec (FRA)	Grit Breuer (GER)	Sandra Myers (ESP)
1993 Stuttgart	Jearl Miles (USA)	Natasha Kaiser-Brown (USA)	Sandie Richards (JAM)
1995 Gothenburg	Marie-José Pérec (FRA)	Pauline Davis (BAH)	Jearl Miles (USA)
1997 Athens	Cathy Freeman (AUS)	Sandie Richards (JAM)	Jearl Miles Clark (USA)
1999 Seville	Cathy Freeman (AUS)	Anja Rücker (GER)	Lorraine Graham-Fenton (JAM)
2001 Edmonton	Amy Mbacké Thiam (SEN)	Lorraine Fenton (JAM)	Ana Guevara (MEX)
2003 Saint-Denis	Ana Guevara (MEX)	Lorraine Fenton (JAM)	Amy Mbacké Thiam (SEN)
2005 Helsinki	Tonique Williams-Darling (BAH)	Sanya Richards (USA)	Ana Guevara (MEX)
2007 Osaka	Christine Ohuruogu (GBR)	Nicola Sanders (GBR)	Novlene Williams (JAM)
2009 Berlin	Sanya Richards (USA)	Shericka Williams (JAM)	Antonina Krivoshapka (RUS)
2011 Daegu	Amantle Montsho (BOT)	Allyson Felix (USA)	Francena McCorory (USA)§
2013 Moscow	Christine Ohuruogu (GBR)	Amantle Montsho (BOT)	Stephanie McPherson (JAM)^{§}
2015 Beijing	Allyson Felix (USA)	Shaunae Miller (BAH)	Shericka Jackson (JAM)
2017 London	Phyllis Francis (USA)	Salwa Eid Naser (BHR)	Allyson Felix (USA)
2019 Doha	Salwa Eid Naser (BHR)	Shaunae Miller-Uibo (BAH)	Shericka Jackson (JAM)
2022 Eugene	Shaunae Miller-Uibo (BAH)	Marileidy Paulino (DOM)	Sada Williams (BAR)
2023 Budapest	Marileidy Paulino (DOM)	Natalia Kaczmarek (POL)	Sada Williams (BAR)
2025 Tokyo	Sydney McLaughlin-Levrone (USA)	Marileidy Paulino (DOM)	Salwa Eid Naser (BHR)

§ : awarded following doping disqualification.

==== Medalists by country ====
Rank	Nation	Gold	Silver	Bronze	Total
1	United States (USA)	5	3	4	12
2	Bahamas (BAH)	2	3	0	5
3	Great Britain (GBR)	2	1	0	3
5	Australia (AUS)	2	0	0	2
5	France (FRA)	2	0	0	2
6	Dominican Republic (DOM)	1	2	0	3
7	Bahrain (BHR)	1	1	1	3
8	Botswana (BOT)	1	1	0	2
8	Czechoslovakia (TCH)	1	1	0	2
10	Mexico (MEX)	1	0	2	3
11	Senegal (SEN)	1	0	1	2
11	Soviet Union (URS)	1	0	1	2
13	Jamaica (JAM)	0	4	6	10
14	Germany (GER)	0	2	0	2
15	East Germany (GDR)	0	1	1	2
16	Poland (POL)	0	1	0	1
17	Barbados (BAR)	0	0	2	2
17	Russia (RUS)	0	0	2	2
13	Spain (ESP)	0	0	1	1

=== 800 m ===
Championships	Gold	Silver	Bronze
1983 Helsinki	Jarmila Kratochvílová (TCH)	Lyubov Gurina (URS)	Yekaterina Podkopayeva (URS)
1987 Rome	Sigrun Wodars (GDR)	Christine Wachtel (GDR)	Lyubov Gurina (URS)
1991 Tokyo	Liliya Nurutdinova (URS)	Ana Fidelia Quirot (CUB)	Ella Kovacs (ROU)
1993 Stuttgart	Maria Mutola (MOZ)	Lyubov Gurina (RUS)	Ella Kovacs (ROU)
1995 Gothenburg	Ana Fidelia Quirot (CUB)	Letitia Vriesde (SUR)	Kelly Holmes (GBR)
1997 Athens	Ana Fidelia Quirot (CUB)	Yelena Afanasyeva (RUS)	Maria Mutola (MOZ)
1999 Seville	Ludmila Formanová (CZE)	Maria Mutola (MOZ)	Svetlana Masterkova (RUS)
2001 Edmonton	Maria Mutola (MOZ)	Stephanie Graf (AUT)	Letitia Vriesde (SUR)
2003 Saint-Denis	Maria Mutola (MOZ)	Kelly Holmes (GBR)	Natalya Khrushcheleva (RUS)
2005 Helsinki	Zulia Calatayud (CUB)	Hasna Benhassi (MAR)	Tatyana Andrianova (RUS)
2007 Osaka	Janeth Jepkosgei (KEN)	Hasna Benhassi (MAR)	Mayte Martínez (ESP)
2009 Berlin	Caster Semenya (RSA)	Janeth Jepkosgei (KEN)	Jenny Meadows (GBR)
2011 Daegu	Caster Semenya (RSA)	Janeth Jepkosgei (KEN)	Alysia Johnson Montaño (USA)
2013 Moscow	Eunice Sum (KEN)	Brenda Martinez (USA)	Alysia Johnson Montaño (USA)
2015 Beijing	Maryna Arzamasava (BLR)	Melissa Bishop (CAN)	Eunice Sum (KEN)
2017 London	Caster Semenya (RSA)	Francine Niyonsaba (BDI)	Ajeé Wilson (USA)
2019 Doha	Halimah Nakaayi (UGA)	Raevyn Rogers (USA)	Ajeé Wilson (USA)
2022 Eugene	Athing Mu (USA)	Keely Hodgkinson (GBR)	Mary Moraa (KEN)
2023 Budapest	Mary Moraa (KEN)	Keely Hodgkinson (GBR)	Athing Mu (USA)
2025 Tokyo	Lilian Odira (KEN)	Georgia Hunter Bell (GBR)	Keely Hodgkinson (GBR)

==== Medalists by country ====
Rank	Nation	Gold	Silver	Bronze	Total
1	Kenya (KEN)	4	2	2	8
2	Mozambique (MOZ)	3	1	1	5
3	Cuba (CUB)	3	1	0	4
4	South Africa (RSA)	3	0	0	3
5	United States (USA)	1	2	5	8
6	Soviet Union (URS)	1	1	2	4
7	East Germany (GDR)	1	1	0	2
8	Belarus (BLR)	1	0	0	1
8	Czech Republic (CZE)	1	0	0	1
8	Czechoslovakia (TCH)	1	0	0	1
8	Uganda (UGA)	1	0	0	1
12	Great Britain (GBR)	0	4	3	7
13	Russia (RUS)	0	2	3	5
14	Morocco (MAR)	0	2	0	2
15	Suriname (SUR)	0	1	1	2
16	Austria (AUT)	0	1	0	1
17	Romania (ROM)	0	0	2	2
18	Spain (ESP)	0	0	1	1
19	Burundi (BDI)	0	1	0	1
19	Canada (CAN)	0	1	0	1

=== 1500 m ===
Championships	Gold	Silver	Bronze
1983 Helsinki	Mary Decker (USA)	Zamira Zaytseva (URS)	Yekaterina Podkopayeva (URS)
1987 Rome	Tetyana Samolenko (URS)	Hildegard Körner (GDR)	Doina Melinte (ROU)
1991 Tokyo	Hassiba Boulmerka (ALG)	Tetyana Dorovskikh (URS)	Lyudmila Rogachova (URS)
1993 Stuttgart	Liu Dong (CHN)	Sonia O'Sullivan (IRL)	Hassiba Boulmerka (ALG)
1995 Gothenburg	Hassiba Boulmerka (ALG)	Kelly Holmes (GBR)	Carla Sacramento (POR)
1997 Athens	Carla Sacramento (POR)	Regina Jacobs (USA)	Anita Weyermann (SUI)
1999 Seville	Svetlana Masterkova (RUS)	Regina Jacobs (USA)	Kutre Dulecha (ETH)
2001 Edmonton	Gabriela Szabo (ROU)	Violeta Szekely (ROU)	Natalya Gorelova (RUS)
2003 Saint-Denis	Tatyana Tomashova (RUS)	Süreyya Ayhan (TUR)	Hayley Tullett (GBR)
2005 Helsinki	Tatyana Tomashova (RUS)	Olga Yegorova (RUS)	Bouchra Ghezielle (FRA)
2007 Osaka	Maryam Yusuf Jamal (BHR)	Iryna Lishchynska (UKR)	Daniela Yordanova (BUL)
2009 Berlin	Maryam Yusuf Jamal (BHR)	Lisa Dobriskey (GBR)	Shannon Rowbury (USA)
2011 Daegu	Jennifer Simpson (USA)	Hannah England (GBR)	Natalia Rodríguez (ESP)
2013 Moscow	Abeba Aregawi (SWE)	Jennifer Simpson (USA)	Hellen Obiri (KEN)
2015 Beijing	Genzebe Dibaba (ETH)	Faith Kipyegon (KEN)	Sifan Hassan (NED)
2017 London	Faith Kipyegon (KEN)	Jennifer Simpson (USA)	Caster Semenya (RSA)
2019 Doha	Sifan Hassan (NED)	Faith Kipyegon (KEN)	Gudaf Tsegay (ETH)
2022 Eugene	Faith Kipyegon (KEN)	Gudaf Tsegay (ETH)	Laura Muir (GBR)
2023 Budapest	Faith Kipyegon (KEN)	Diribe Welteji (ETH)	Sifan Hassan (NED)
2025 Tokyo	Faith Kipyegon (KEN)	Dorcas Ewoi (KEN)	Jessica Hull (AUS)

==== Medalists by country ====
Rank	Nation	Gold	Silver	Bronze	Total
1	Kenya (KEN)	4	3	1	8
2	Russia (RUS)	3	1	1	5
3	United States (USA)	2	4	1	7
4	Algeria (ALG)	2	0	1	3
5	Bahrain (BHR)	2	0	0	2
7	Ethiopia (ETH)	1	2	2	5
7	Soviet Union (URS)	1	2	2	5
9	Romania (ROU)	1	1	1	3
10	Netherlands (NED)	1	0	2	3
11	Portugal (POR)	1	0	1	2
12	China (CHN)	1	0	0	1
12	Sweden (SWE)	1	0	0	1
14	Great Britain (GBR)	0	3	2	5
15	East Germany (GDR)	0	1	0	1
15	Ireland (IRL)	0	1	0	1
15	Ukraine (UKR)	0	1	0	1
15	Turkey (TUR)	0	1	0	1
19	Bulgaria (BUL)	0	0	1	1
19	France (FRA)	0	0	1	1
19	Spain (ESP)	0	0	1	1
19	Switzerland (SUI)	0	0	1	1
19	Australia (AUS)	0	0	1	1

=== 3000 m ===
Championships	Gold	Silver	Bronze
1980 Sittard	Birgit Friedmann (FRG)	Karoline Nemetz (SWE)	Ingrid Kristiansen (NOR)
1983 Helsinki	Mary Decker (USA)	Brigitte Kraus (FRG)	Tatyana Kovalenko-Kazankina (URS)
1987 Rome	Tetyana Samolenko (URS)	Maricica Puică (ROU)	Ulrike Bruns (GDR)
1991 Tokyo	Tetyana Dorovskikh (URS)	Yelena Romanova (URS)	Susan Sirma (KEN)
1993 Stuttgart	Qu Yunxia (CHN)	Zhang Linli (CHN)	Zhang Lirong (CHN)

=== 5000 m ===
Championships	Gold	Silver	Bronze
1995 Gothenburg	Sonia O'Sullivan (IRL)	Fernanda Ribeiro (POR)	Zahra Ouaziz (MAR)
1997 Athens	Gabriela Szabo (ROU)	Roberta Brunet (ITA)	Fernanda Ribeiro (POR)
1999 Seville	Gabriela Szabo (ROU)	Zahra Ouaziz (MAR)	Ayelech Worku (ETH)
2001 Edmonton	Olga Yegorova (RUS)	Marta Dominguez (ESP)	Ayelech Worku (ETH)
2003 Saint-Denis	Tirunesh Dibaba (ETH)	Marta Dominguez (ESP)	Edith Masai (KEN)
2005 Helsinki	Tirunesh Dibaba (ETH)	Meseret Defar (ETH)	Ejegayehu Dibaba (ETH)
2007 Osaka	Meseret Defar (ETH)	Vivian Cheruiyot (KEN)	Priscah Jepleting Cherono (KEN)
2009 Berlin	Vivian Cheruiyot (KEN)	Sylvia Jebiwott Kibet (KEN)	Meseret Defar (ETH)
2011 Daegu	Vivian Cheruiyot (KEN)	Sylvia Jebiwott Kibet (KEN)	Meseret Defar (ETH)
2013 Moscow	Meseret Defar (ETH)	Mercy Cherono (KEN)	Almaz Ayana (ETH)
2015 Beijing	Almaz Ayana (ETH)	Senbere Teferi (ETH)	Genzebe Dibaba (ETH)
2017 London	Hellen Obiri (KEN)	Almaz Ayana (ETH)	Sifan Hassan (NED)
2019 Doha	Hellen Obiri (KEN)	Margaret Kipkemboi (KEN)	Konstanze Klosterhalfen (GER)
2022 Eugene	Gudaf Tsegay (ETH)	Beatrice Chebet (KEN)	Dawit Seyaum (ETH)
2023 Budapest	Faith Kipyegon (KEN)	Sifan Hassan (NED)	Beatrice Chebet (KEN)
2025 Tokyo	Beatrice Chebet (KEN)	Faith Kipyegon (KEN)	Nadia Battocletti (ITA)

=== 10,000 m ===
Championships	Gold	Silver	Bronze
1987 Rome	Ingrid Kristiansen (NOR)	Yelena Zhupiyeva-Vyazova (URS)	Kathrin Weßel (GDR)
1991 Tokyo	Liz McColgan (GBR)	Zhong Huandi (CHN)	Wang Xiuting (CHN)
1993 Stuttgart	Wang Junxia (CHN)	Zhong Huandi (CHN)	Sally Barsosio (KEN)
1995 Gothenburg	Fernanda Ribeiro (POR)	Derartu Tulu (ETH)	Tegla Loroupe (KEN)
1997 Athens	Sally Barsosio (KEN)	Fernanda Ribeiro (POR)	Masako Chiba (JPN)
1999 Seville	Gete Wami (ETH)	Paula Radcliffe (GBR)	Tegla Loroupe (KEN)
2001 Edmonton	Derartu Tulu (ETH)	Berhane Adere (ETH)	Gete Wami (ETH)
2003 Saint-Denis	Berhane Adere (ETH)	Werknesh Kidane (ETH)	Sun Yingjie (CHN)
2005 Helsinki	Tirunesh Dibaba (ETH)	Berhane Adere (ETH)	Ejegayehu Dibaba (ETH)
2007 Osaka	Tirunesh Dibaba (ETH)	Kara Goucher (USA)	Jo Pavey (GBR)
2009 Berlin	Linet Masai (KEN)	Meselech Melkamu (ETH)	Wude Ayalew (ETH)
2011 Daegu	Vivian Cheruiyot (KEN)	Sally Kipyego (KEN)	Linet Masai (KEN)
2013 Moscow	Tirunesh Dibaba (ETH)	Gladys Cherono Kiprono (KEN)	Belaynesh Oljira (ETH)
2015 Beijing	Vivian Cheruiyot (KEN)	Gelete Burka (ETH)	Emily Infeld (USA)
2017 London	Almaz Ayana (ETH)	Tirunesh Dibaba (ETH)	Agnes Tirop (KEN)
2019 Doha	Sifan Hassan (NED)	Letesenbet Gidey (ETH)	Agnes Tirop (KEN)
2022 Eugene	Letesenbet Gidey (ETH)	Hellen Obiri (KEN)	Margaret Kipkemboi (KEN)
2023 Budapest	Gudaf Tsegay (ETH)	Letesenbet Gidey (ETH)	Ejgayehu Taye (ETH)
2025 Tokyo	Beatrice Chebet (KEN)	Nadia Battocletti (ITA)	Gudaf Tsegay (ETH)

=== 100 m hurdles ===
Championships	Gold	Silver	Bronze
1983 Helsinki	Bettine Jahn (GDR)	Kerstin Knabe (GDR)	Ginka Zagorcheva (BUL)
1987 Rome	Ginka Zagorcheva (BUL)	Gloria Uibel (GDR)	Cornelia Oschkenat (GDR)
1991 Tokyo	Ludmila Narozhilenko (URS)	Gail Devers (USA)	Nataliya Grygoryeva (URS)
1993 Stuttgart	Gail Devers (USA)	Marina Azyabina (RUS)	Lynda Tolbert-Goode (USA)
1995 Gothenburg	Gail Devers (USA)	Olga Shishigina (KAZ)	Yuliya Graudyn (RUS)
1997 Athens	Ludmila Engquist (SWE)	Svetla Dimitrova (BUL)	Michelle Freeman (JAM)
1999 Seville	Gail Devers (USA)	Glory Alozie (NGR)	Ludmila Engquist (SWE)
2001 Edmonton	Anjanette Kirkland (USA)	Gail Devers (USA)	Olga Shishigina (KAZ)
2003 Saint-Denis	Perdita Felicien (CAN)	Brigitte Foster-Hylton (JAM)	Miesha McKelvy (USA)
2005 Helsinki	Michelle Perry (USA)	Delloreen Ennis-London (JAM)	Brigitte Foster-Hylton (JAM)
2007 Osaka	Michelle Perry (USA)	Perdita Felicien (CAN)	Delloreen Ennis-London (JAM)
2009 Berlin	Brigitte Foster-Hylton (JAM)	Priscilla Lopes-Schliep (CAN)	Delloreen Ennis-London (JAM)
2011 Daegu	Sally Pearson (AUS)	Danielle Carruthers (USA)	Dawn Harper (USA)
2013 Moscow	Brianna Rollins (USA)	Sally Pearson (AUS)	Tiffany Porter (GBR)
2015 Beijing	Danielle Williams (JAM)	Cindy Roleder (GER)	Alina Talay (BLR)
2017 London	Sally Pearson (AUS)	Dawn Harper-Nelson (USA)	Pamela Dutkiewicz (GER)
2019 Doha	Nia Ali (USA)	Kendra Harrison (USA)	Danielle Williams (JAM)
2022 Eugene	Tobi Amusan (NGR)	Britany Anderson (JAM)	Jasmine Camacho-Quinn (PUR)
2023 Budapest	Danielle Williams (JAM)	Jasmine Camacho-Quinn (PUR)	Kendra Harrison (USA)
2025 Tokyo	Ditaji Kambundji (CHE)	Tobi Amusan (NGR)	Grace Stark (USA)

=== 400 m hurdles ===
Championships	Gold	Silver	Bronze
1980 Sittard	Bärbel Broschat (GDR)	Ellen Neumann (GDR)	Petra Pfaff (GDR)
1983 Helsinki	Yekaterina Fesenko (URS)	Ana Ambrazienė (URS)	Ellen Neumann-Fiedler (GDR)
1987 Rome	Sabine Busch (GDR)	Debbie Flintoff (AUS)	Cornelia Feuerbach (GDR)
1991 Tokyo	Tatyana Ledovskaya (URS)	Sally Gunnell (GBR)	Janeene Vickers (USA)
1993 Stuttgart	Sally Gunnell (GBR)	Sandra Farmer-Patrick (USA)	Margarita Ponomaryova (RUS)
1995 Gothenburg	Kim Batten (USA)	Tonja Buford (USA)	Deon Hemmings (JAM)
1997 Athens	Nezha Bidouane (MAR)	Deon Hemmings (JAM)	Kim Batten (USA)
1999 Seville	Daimí Pernía (CUB)	Nezha Bidouane (MAR)	Deon Hemmings (JAM)
2001 Edmonton	Nezha Bidouane (MAR)	Yuliya Pechonkina (RUS)	Daimí Pernía (CUB)
2003 Saint-Denis	Jana Pittman (AUS)	Sandra Glover (USA)	Yuliya Pechonkina (RUS)
2005 Helsinki	Yuliya Pechonkina (RUS)	Lashinda Demus (USA)	Sandra Glover (USA)
2007 Osaka	Jana Rawlinson (AUS)	Yuliya Pechenkina (RUS)	Anna Jesień (POL)
2009 Berlin	Melaine Walker (JAM)	Lashinda Demus (USA)	Josanne Lucas (TRI)
2011 Daegu	Lashinda Demus (USA)	Melaine Walker (JAM)	Natalya Antyukh (RUS)
2013 Moscow	Zuzana Hejnová (CZE)	Dalilah Muhammad (USA)	Lashinda Demus (USA)
2015 Beijing	Zuzana Hejnová (CZE)	Shamier Little (USA)	Cassandra Tate (USA)
2017 London	Kori Carter (USA)	Dalilah Muhammad (USA)	Ristananna Tracey (JAM)
2019 Doha	Dalilah Muhammad (USA)	Sydney McLaughlin (USA)	Rushell Clayton (JAM)
2022 Eugene	Sydney McLaughlin (USA)	Femke Bol (NED)	Dalilah Muhammad (USA)
2023 Budapest	Femke Bol (NED)	Shamier Little (USA)	Rushell Clayton (JAM)
2025 Tokyo	Femke Bol (NED)	Jasmine Jones (USA)	Emma Zapletalová (SVK)

==== Medal table ====
Rank	Nation	Gold	Silver	Bronze	Total
1	United States (USA)	5	11	6	22
2	East Germany (GDR)	2	1	3	6
3	Australia (AUS)	2	1	0	3
3	Morocco (MAR)	2	1	0	3
3	Soviet Union (URS)	2	1	0	3
3	Netherlands (NED)	2	1	0	3
7	Czech Republic (CZE)	2	0	0	2
8	Jamaica (JAM)	1	2	4	7
9	Russia (RUS)	1	2	3	6
10	Great Britain (GBR)	1	1	0	2
11	Cuba (CUB)	1	0	1	2
12	Denmark (DEN)	1	0	0	1
13	Spain (ESP)	0	1	0	1
13	Turkey (TUR)	0	1	0	1
17	Poland (POL)	0	0	1	1
17	Trinidad and Tobago (TTO)	0	0	1	1
17	Slovakia (SVK)	0	0	1	1

=== 3000 m steeplechase ===
Championships	Gold	Silver	Bronze
2005 Helsinki	Dorcus Inzikuru (UGA)	Yekaterina Volkova (RUS)	Jeruto Kiptum (KEN)
2007 Osaka	Yekaterina Volkova (RUS)	Tatyana Petrova (RUS)	Eunice Jepkorir (KEN)
2009 Berlin	Vacant	Yuliya Zarudneva (RUS)	Milcah Chemos Cheywa (KEN)
2011 Daegu	Habiba Ghribi (TUN)	Milcah Chemos Cheywa (KEN)	Mercy Wanjiku (KEN)
2013 Moscow	Milcah Chemos Cheywa (KEN)	Lydiah Chepkurui (KEN)	Sofia Assefa (ETH)
2015 Beijing	Hyvin Jepkemoi (KEN)	Habiba Ghribi (TUN)	Gesa Felicitas Krause (GER)
2017 London	Emma Coburn (USA)	Courtney Frerichs (USA)	Hyvin Jepkemoi (KEN)
2019 Doha	Beatrice Chepkoech (KEN)	Emma Coburn (USA)	Gesa Felicitas Krause (GER)
2022 Eugene	Norah Jeruto (KAZ)	Werkuha Getachew (ETH)	Mekides Abebe (ETH)
2023 Budapest	Winfred Yavi (BHR)	Beatrice Chepkoech (KEN)	Faith Cherotich (KEN)
2025 Tokyo	Faith Cherotich (KEN)	Winfred Yavi (BHR)	Sembo Almayew (ETH)

=== 4 × 100 metres relay ===
Championships	Gold	Silver	Bronze
1983 Helsinki	East Germany (GDR); Silke Gladisch; Marita Koch; Ingrid Auerswald; Marlies Oelsner-Göhr	Great Britain (GBR); Joan Baptiste; Kathy Cook; Beverley Callender; Shirley Thomas	Jamaica (JAM); Leleith Hodges; Jacqueline Pusey; Juliet Cuthbert; Merlene Ottey
1987 Rome	United States (USA); Alice Brown; Diane Williams; Florence Griffith-Joyner; Pam Marshall	East Germany (GDR); Silke Möller; Cornelia Oschkenat; Kerstin Behrendt; Marlies Göhr	Soviet Union (URS); Irina Slyusar; Natalya Pomoshchnikova; Natalya German; Olga Antonova
1991 Tokyo	Jamaica (JAM); Dahlia Duhaney; Juliet Cuthbert; Beverly McDonald; Merlene Ottey; Merlene Frazer*	Soviet Union (URS); Natalya Kovtun; Galina Malchugina; Yelena Vinogradova; Irina Privalova	Germany (GER); Grit Breuer; Katrin Krabbe; Sabine Richter; Heike Drechsler
1993 Stuttgart	Russia (RUS); Olga Bogoslovskaya; Galina Malchugina; Natalya Pomoshchnikova-Voronova; Irina Privalova; Marina Trandenkova*	United States (USA); Michelle Finn; Gwen Torrence; Wendy Vereen; Gail Devers; Sheila Echols*	Jamaica (JAM); Michelle Freeman; Juliet Campbell; Nikole Mitchell; Merlene Ottey; Dahlia Duhaney*
1995 Gothenburg	United States (USA); Celena Mondie-Milner; Carlette Guidry; Chryste Gaines; Gwen Torrence; D'Andre Hill*	Jamaica (JAM); Dahlia Duhaney; Juliet Cuthbert; Beverly McDonald; Merlene Ottey; Michelle Freeman*	Germany (GER); Melanie Paschke; Silke Lichtenhagen; Silke-Beate Knoll; Gabriele Becker
1997 Athens	United States (USA); Chryste Gaines; Marion Jones; Inger Miller; Gail Devers	Jamaica (JAM); Beverly McDonald; Merlene Frazer; Juliet Cuthbert; Beverly Grant	France (FRA); Patricia Girard-Léno; Christine Arron; Delphine Combe; Sylviane Félix; Frédérique Bangué*
1999 Seville	Bahamas (BAH); Savatheda Fynes; Chandra Sturrup; Pauline Davis-Thompson; Debbie Ferguson; Eldece Clarke-Lewis*	France (FRA); Patricia Girard; Muriel Hurtis; Katia Benth; Christine Arron; Fabé Dia*	Jamaica (JAM); Aleen Bailey; Merlene Frazer, Beverly McDonald; Peta-Gaye Dowdie
2001 Edmonton^{dq1}	Germany (GER); Melanie Paschke; Gabi Rockmeier; Birgit Rockmeier; Marion Wagner	France (FRA); Sylviane Félix; Frédérique Bangué; Muriel Hurtis; Odiah Sidibé	Jamaica (JAM); Juliet Campbell; Merlene Frazer; Beverly McDonald; Astia Walker; Elva Goulbourne*
2003 Saint-Denis	France (FRA); Patricia Girard-Léno; Muriel Hurtis; Sylviane Félix; Christine Arron	United States (USA); Angela Williams; Chryste Gaines; Inger Miller; Torri Edwards; Lauryn Williams*	Russia (RUS); Olga Fyodorova; Yuliya Tabakova; Marina Kislova; Larisa Kruglova
2005 Helsinki	United States (USA); Angela Daigle; Muna Lee; Me'Lisa Barber; Lauryn Williams	Jamaica (JAM); Danielle Browning; Sherone Simpson; Aleen Bailey; Veronica Campbell; Beverly McDonald*	Belarus (BLR); Yulia Nestsiarenka; Natallia Solohub; Alena Newmyarzhytskaya; Aksana Drahun
2007 Osaka	United States (USA); Lauryn Williams; Allyson Felix; Mikele Barber; Torri Edwards; Carmelita Jeter*; Mechelle Lewis*	Jamaica (JAM); Sheri-Ann Brooks; Kerron Stewart; Simone Facey; Veronica Campbell; Shelly-Ann Fraser*	Belgium (BEL); Olivia Borlée; Hanna Mariën; Élodie Ouédraogo; Kim Gevaert
2009 Berlin	Jamaica (JAM); Simone Facey; Shelly-Ann Fraser; Aleen Bailey; Kerron Stewart	Bahamas (BAH); Sheniqua Ferguson; Chandra Sturrup; Christine Amertil; Debbie Ferguson-McKenzie	Germany (GER); Marion Wagner; Anne Möllinger; Cathleen Tschirch; Verena Sailer
2011 Daegu	United States (USA); Bianca Knight; Allyson Felix; Marshevet Myers; Carmelita Jeter; Shalonda Solomon*; Alexandria Anderson*	Jamaica (JAM); Shelly-Ann Fraser-Pryce; Kerron Stewart; Sherone Simpson; Veronica Campbell-Brown; Jura Levy*	Ukraine (UKR); Olesya Povh; Nataliya Pohrebnyak; Mariya Ryemyen; Hrystyna Stuy
2013 Moscow	Jamaica (JAM); Carrie Russell; Kerron Stewart; Schillonie Calvert; Shelly-Ann Fraser-Pryce; Sheri-Ann Brooks*	United States (USA); Jeneba Tarmoh; Alexandria Anderson; English Gardner; Octavious Freeman	Great Britain (GBR); Dina Asher-Smith; Ashleigh Nelson; Annabelle Lewis; Hayley Jones
2015 Beijing	Jamaica (JAM); Veronica Campbell-Brown; Natasha Morrison; Elaine Thompson; Shelly-Ann Fraser-Pryce; Sherone Simpson*; Kerron Stewart*	United States (USA); English Gardner; Allyson Felix; Jenna Prandini; Jasmine Todd	Trinidad and Tobago (TRI); Kelly-Ann Baptiste; Michelle-Lee Ahye; Reyare Thomas; Semoy Hackett; Khalifa St. Fort*
2017 London	United States (USA); Aaliyah Brown; Allyson Felix; Morolake Akinosun; Tori Bowie; Ariana Washington*	Great Britain (GBR); Asha Philip; Desirèe Henry; Dina Asher-Smith; Daryll Neita	Jamaica (JAM); Jura Levy; Natasha Morrison; Simone Facey; Sashalee Forbes; Christania Williams*
2019 Doha	Jamaica (JAM); Natalliah Whyte; Shelly-Ann Fraser-Pryce; Jonielle Smith; Shericka Jackson; Natasha Morrison*	Great Britain (GBR); Asha Philip; Dina Asher-Smith; Ashleigh Nelson; Daryll Neita; Imani-Lara Lansiquot*	United States (USA); Dezerea Bryant; Teahna Daniels; Morolake Akinosun; Kiara Parker
2022 Eugene	United States (USA); Melissa Jefferson; Abby Steiner; Jenna Prandini; Twanisha Terry; Aleia Hobbs*	Jamaica (JAM); Kemba Nelson; Elaine Thompson-Herah; Shelly-Ann Fraser-Pryce; Shericka Jackson; Briana Williams*; Natalliah Whyte*; Remona Burchell*	Germany (GER); Tatjana Pinto; Alexandra Burghardt; Gina Lückenkemper; Rebekka Haase
2023 Budapest	United States (USA); Tamari Davis; Twanisha Terry; Gabrielle Thomas; Sha'Carri Richardson; Tamara Clark*; Melissa Jefferson*	Jamaica (JAM); Natasha Morrison; Shelly-Ann Fraser-Pryce; Shashalee Forbes; Shericka Jackson; Briana Williams*; Elaine Thompson-Herah*	Great Britain (GBR); Asha Philip; Imani-Lara Lansiquot; Bianca Williams; Daryll Neita; Annie Tagoe*
2025 Tokyo	United States (USA); Melissa Jefferson-Wooden; Twanisha Terry; Kayla White; Sha'Carri Richardson; Jacious Sears*	Jamaica (JAM); Shelly-Ann Fraser-Pryce; Tia Clayton; Tina Clayton; Jonielle Smith; Jodean Williams*	Germany (GER); Sina Mayer; Rebekka Haase; Sophia Junk; Gina Lückenkemper

Note * Indicates athletes who ran only in the preliminary round and also received medals.

- ^{dq1} The United States team of Kelli White, Chryste Gaines, Inger Miller, and Marion Jones originally won the 2001 World Championship in a time of 41.71 seconds, but were disqualified after Jones and White were found to have used performance-enhancing drugs.

=== 4 × 400 metres relay ===
Championships	Gold	Silver	Bronze
1983 Helsinki	East Germany (GDR); Kerstin Walther; Sabine Busch; Marita Koch; Dagmar Rübsam; Undine Bremer*; Ellen Fiedler*	Czechoslovakia (TCH); Taťána Kocembová; Milena Matějkovičová; Zuzana Moravčíková; Jarmila Kratochvílová	Soviet Union (URS); Yelena Korban; Marina Ivanova; Irina Baskakova; Mariya Pinigina
1987 Rome	East Germany (GDR); Dagmar Neubauer; Kirsten Emmelmann; Petra Müller; Sabine Busch; Cornelia Ullrich*	Soviet Union (URS); Aelita Yurchenko; Olga Nazarova; Mariya Pinigina; Olga Bryzgina	United States (USA); Diane Dixon; Denean Howard; Valerie Brisco; Lillie Leatherwood
1991 Tokyo	Soviet Union (URS); Tatyana Ledovskaya; Lyudmyla Dzhyhalova; Olga Nazarova; Olga Bryzgina; Anna Chuprina*	United States (USA); Rochelle Stevens; Diane Dixon; Jearl Miles; Lillie Leatherwood; Natasha Kaiser-Brown*	Germany (GER); Uta Rohländer; Katrin Krabbe; Christine Wachtel; Grit Breuer; Annett Hesselbarth*; Katrin Schreiter*
1993 Stuttgart	United States (USA); Gwen Torrence; Maicel Malone-Wallace; Natasha Kaiser; Jearl Miles; Terri Dendy*; Michelle Collins*	Russia (RUS); Yelena Rouzina; Tatyana Alekseyeva; Margarita Ponomaryova; Irina Privalova; Yelena Golesheva*; Vera Sychugova*	Great Britain (GBR); Linda Keough; Phylis Smith; Tracy Goddard; Sally Gunnell
1995 Gothenburg	United States (USA); Kim Graham; Rochelle Stevens; Camara Jones; Jearl Miles; Nicole Green*	Russia (RUS); Tatyana Chebykina; Svetlana Goncharenko; Yuliya Sotnikova; Yelena Andreyeva; Tatyana Zakharova*	Australia (AUS); Lee Naylor; Renée Poetschka; Melinda Gainsford; Cathy Freeman
1997 Athens	Germany (GER); Anke Feller; Uta Rohländer; Anja Rücker; Grit Breuer	United States (USA); Maicel Malone; Kim Graham; Kim Batten; Jearl Miles Clark; Michelle Collins*; Natasha Kaiser-Brown*	Jamaica (JAM); Inez Turner; Lorraine Graham; Deon Hemmings; Sandie Richards; Nadia Graham-Hutchinson*
1999 Seville	Russia (RUS); Tatyana Chebykina; Svetlana Goncharenko; Olga Kotlyarova; Natalya Nazarova; Natalya Sharova*; Yekaterina Bakhvalova*	United States (USA); Suziann Reid; Maicel Malone-Wallace; Michelle Collins; Jearl Miles Clark; Andrea Anderson*	Germany (GER); Anke Feller; Uta Rohländer; Anja Rücker; Grit Breuer; Anja Knippel*
2001 Edmonton	Jamaica (JAM); Sandie Richards; Catherine Scott-Pomales; Debbie-Ann Parris; Lorraine Fenton; Michelle Burgher*; Deon Hemmings*	Germany (GER); Florence Ekpo-Umoh; Shanta Ghosh; Claudia Marx; Grit Breuer	Russia (RUS); Irina Rosikhina; Yuliya Pechonkina; Anastasiya Kapachinskaya; Olesya Zykina; Natalya Shevtsova*
2003 Saint-Denis	United States (USA); Demetria Washington; Jearl Miles Clark; Me'Lisa Barber; Sanya Richards; DeeDee Trotter*	Russia (RUS); Anastasiya Kapachinskaya; Natalya Nazarova; Olesya Zykina; Yuliya Pechonkina (Nosova); Svetlana Goncharenko*; Svetlana Pospelova*	Jamaica (JAM); Allison Beckford; Lorraine Fenton (Graham); Ronetta Smith; Sandie Richards; Michelle Burgher*
2005 Helsinki	Russia (RUS); Yuliya Pechonkina; Olesya Krasnomovets; Natalya Antyukh; Svetlana Pospelova; Tatyana Firova*; Olesya Zykina*	Jamaica (JAM); Shericka Williams; Novlene Williams; Ronetta Smith; Lorraine Fenton	Great Britain (GBR); Lee McConnell; Donna Fraser; Nicola Sanders; Christine Ohuruogu
2007 Osaka	United States (USA); DeeDee Trotter; Allyson Felix; Mary Wineberg; Sanya Richards; Monique Hennagan*; Natasha Hastings*	Jamaica (JAM); Shericka Williams; Shereefa Lloyd; Davita Prendagast; Novlene Williams; Anastasia Le-Roy*	Great Britain (GBR); Christine Ohuruogu; Marilyn Okoro; Lee McConnell; Nicola Sanders; Donna Fraser*
2009 Berlin^{dq1}	United States (USA); Debbie Dunn; Allyson Felix; Lashinda Demus; Sanya Richards; Natasha Hastings*; Jessica Beard*	Jamaica (JAM); Rosemarie Whyte; Novlene Williams-Mills; Shereefa Lloyd; Shericka Williams; Kaliese Spencer*	Great Britain (GBR); Lee McConnell; Christine Ohuruogu; Vicki Barr; Nicola Sanders; Jenny Meadows*
2011 Daegu^{dq2}	United States (USA); Sanya Richards-Ross; Allyson Felix; Jessica Beard; Francena McCorory; Natasha Hastings*; Keshia Baker*	Jamaica (JAM); Rosemarie Whyte; Davita Prendergast; Novlene Williams-Mills; Shericka Williams; Shereefa Lloyd*; Patricia Hall*	Great Britain (GBR); Perri Shakes-Drayton; Nicola Sanders; Christine Ohuruogu; Lee McConnell
2013 Moscow^{dq3}	United States (USA); Jessica Beard; Natasha Hastings; Ashley Spencer; Francena McCorory; Joanna Atkins*	Great Britain (GBR); Eilidh Child; Shana Cox; Margaret Adeoye; Christine Ohuruogu	France (FRA); Marie Gayot; Lénora Guion-Firmin; Muriel Hurtis-Houairi; Floria Guei; Phara Anacharsis*
2015 Beijing	Jamaica (JAM); Christine Day; Shericka Jackson; Stephenie Ann McPherson; Novlene Williams-Mills; Anastasia Le-Roy*; Chrisann Gordon*	United States (USA); Sanya Richards-Ross; Natasha Hastings; Allyson Felix; Francena McCorory; Phyllis Francis*; Jessica Beard*	Great Britain (GBR); Christine Ohuruogu; Anyika Onuora; Eilidh Child; Seren Bundy-Davies; Kirsten McAslan*
2017 London	United States (USA); Quanera Hayes; Allyson Felix; Shakima Wimbley; Phyllis Francis; Kendall Ellis*; Natasha Hastings*	Great Britain (GBR); Zoey Clark; Laviai Nielsen; Eilidh Doyle; Emily Diamond; Perri Shakes-Drayton*	Poland (POL); Małgorzata Hołub; Iga Baumgart; Aleksandra Gaworska; Justyna Święty; Patrycja Wyciszkiewicz*; Martyna Dąbrowska*
2019 Doha	United States (USA); Phyllis Francis; Sydney McLaughlin; Dalilah Muhammad; Wadeline Jonathas; Jessica Beard*; Allyson Felix*; Kendall Ellis*; Courtney Okolo*	Poland (POL); Iga Baumgart-Witan; Patrycja Wyciszkiewicz; Małgorzata Hołub-Kowalik; Justyna Święty-Ersetic; Anna Kiełbasińska*	Jamaica (JAM); Anastasia Le-Roy; Tiffany James; Stephenie Ann McPherson; Shericka Jackson; Roneisha McGregor*
2022 Eugene	United States (USA); Talitha Diggs; Abby Steiner; Britton Wilson; Sydney McLaughlin; Kaylin Whitney*; Allyson Felix*; Jaide Stepter Baynes*	Jamaica (JAM); Candice McLeod; Janieve Russell; Stephenie Ann McPherson; Charokee Young; Stacey Ann Williams*; Junelle Bromfield*; Tiffany James*	Great Britain (GBR); Victoria Ohuruogu; Nicole Yeargin; Jessie Knight; Laviai Nielsen; Ama Pipi*
2023 Budapest	Netherlands (NED); Eveline Saalberg; Lieke Klaver; Cathelijn Peeters; Femke Bol; Lisanne de Witte*	Jamaica (JAM); Candice McLeod; Janieve Russell; Nickisha Pryce; Stacey-Ann Williams; Charokee Young*; Shiann Salmon*	Great Britain (GBR); Laviai Nielsen; Amber Anning; Ama Pipi; Nicole Yeargin; Yemi Mary John*
2025 Tokyo	United States (USA); Isabella Whittaker; Lynna Irby-Jackson; Aaliyah Butler; Sydney McLaughlin-Levrone; Alexis Holmes*; Rosey Effiong*; Quanera Hayes*; Britton Wilson*	Jamaica (JAM); Dejanea Oakley; Stacey Ann Williams; Andrenette Knight; Nickisha Pryce; Roneisha McGregor*	Netherlands (NED); Eveline Saalberg; Lieke Klaver; Lisanne de Witte; Femke Bol; Myrte van der Schoot*

Note: * Indicates athletes who ran only in the preliminary round and also received medals.

- ^{dq1} The Russian team (Anastasiya Kapachinskaya, Tatyana Firova, Lyudmila Litvinova and Antonina Krivoshapka) originally finished third in the 2009 World Championships, but was disqualified after Kapachinskaya was found to have used performance-enhancing drugs.
- ^{dq2} The Russian team (Antonina Krivoshapka, Natalya Antyukh, Lyudmila Litvinova and Anastasiya Kapachinskaya) originally finished third in the 2011 World Championships, but was disqualified after Kapachinskaya was found to have used performance-enhancing drugs.
- ^{dq3} The Russian team (Yuliya Gushchina, Tatyana Firova, Kseniya Ryzhova and Antonina Krivoshapka) originally won in the 2013 World Championships, but was disqualified after Krivoshapka was found to have used performance-enhancing drugs.

==== Medalists by country ====
Rank	Nation	Gold	Silver	Bronze	Total
1	United States (USA)	11	5	1	17
2	Russia (RUS)	3	3	3	9
3	Jamaica (JAM)	2	7	2	11
4	East Germany (GDR)	2	0	0	2
5	Germany (GER)	1	1	2	4
6	Soviet Union (URS)	1	1	1	3
7	Netherlands (NED)	1	0	1	2
8	Great Britain (GBR)	0	2	8	10
9	Poland (POL)	0	1	1	2
10	Czechoslovakia (TCH)	0	1	0	1
11	Australia (AUS)	0	0	1	1
11	France (FRA)	0	0	1	1

=== 4 × 400 metres mixed relay ===
Championships	Gold	Silver	Bronze
2019 Doha	United States (USA); Wilbert London; Allyson Felix; Courtney Okolo; Michael Cherry; Tyrell Richard*; Jessica Beard*; Jasmine Blocker*; Obi Igbokwe*	Jamaica (JAM); Nathon Allen; Roneisha McGregor; Tiffany James; Javon Francis; Janieve Russell*	Bahrain (BHR); Musa Isah; Aminat Jamal; Salwa Eid Naser; Abbas Abubakar Abbas
2022 Eugene	Dominican Republic (DOM); Fiordaliza Cofil; Lidio Andrés Feliz; Alexander Ogando; Marileidy Paulino	Netherlands (NED); Femke Bol; Liemarvin Bonevacia; Tony van Diepen; Lieke Klaver; Eveline Saalberg*	United States (USA); Allyson Felix; Elija Godwin; Vernon Norwood; Kennedy Simon; Wadeline Jonathas*
2023 Budapest	United States (USA); Justin Robinson; Rosey Effiong; Matthew Boling; Alexis Holmes; Ryan Willie*	Great Britain (GBR); Lewis Davey; Laviai Nielsen; Rio Mitcham; Yemi Mary John; Joseph Brier*	Czech Republic (CZE); Matěj Krsek; Tereza Petržilková; Patrik Šorm; Lada Vondrová
2025 Tokyo	United States (USA); Bryce Deadmon; Lynna Irby-Jackson; Jenoah McKiver; Alexis Holmes	Netherlands (NED); Eugene Omalla; Lieke Klaver; Jonas Phijffers; Femke Bol; Eveline Saalberg*	Belgium (BEL); Dylan Borlée; Imke Vervaet; Alexander Doom; Helena Ponette; Jonathan Sacoor*

Note: * Indicates athletes who ran only in the preliminary round and also received medals.

== Road ==
=== Marathon ===
Championships	Gold	Silver	Bronze
1983 Helsinki	Grete Waitz (NOR)	Marianne Dickerson (USA)	Raisa Smekhnova (URS)
1987 Rome	Rosa Mota (POR)	Zoya Ivanova (URS)	Jocelyne Villeton (FRA)
1991 Tokyo	Wanda Panfil (POL)	Sachiko Yamashita (JPN)	Katrin Dörre (GER)
1993 Stuttgart	Junko Asari (JPN)	Manuela Machado (POR)	Tomoe Abe (JPN)
1995 Gothenburg	Manuela Machado (POR)	Anuța Cătună (ROU)	Ornella Ferrara (ITA)
1997 Athens	Hiromi Suzuki (JPN)	Manuela Machado (POR)	Lidia Slăvuțeanu (ROU)
1999 Seville	Jong Song-ok (PRK)	Ari Ichihashi (JPN)	Lidia Șimon (ROU)
2001 Edmonton	Lidia Șimon (ROU)	Reiko Tosa (JPN)	Svetlana Zakharova (RUS)
2003 Saint-Denis	Catherine Ndereba (KEN)	Mizuki Noguchi (JPN)	Masako Chiba (JPN)
2005 Helsinki	Paula Radcliffe (GBR)	Catherine Ndereba (KEN)	Constantina Diţă-Tomescu (ROU)
2007 Osaka	Catherine Ndereba (KEN)	Zhou Chunxiu (CHN)	Reiko Tosa (JPN)
2009 Berlin	Bai Xue (CHN)	Yoshimi Ozaki (JPN)	Aselefech Mergia (ETH)
2011 Daegu	Edna Kiplagat (KEN)	Priscah Jeptoo (KEN)	Sharon Cherop (KEN)
2013 Moscow	Edna Kiplagat (KEN)	Valeria Straneo (ITA)	Kayoko Fukushi (JPN)
2015 Beijing	Mare Dibaba (ETH)	Helah Kiprop (KEN)	Eunice Kirwa (BHR)
2017 London	Rose Chelimo (BHR)	Edna Kiplagat (KEN)	Amy Cragg (USA)
2019 Doha	Ruth Chepng'etich (KEN)	Rose Chelimo (BHR)	Helalia Johannes (NAM)
2022 Eugene	Gotytom Gebreslase (ETH)	Judith Korir (KEN)	Lonah Chemtai Salpeter (ISR)
2023 Budapest	Amane Beriso Shankule (ETH)	Gotytom Gebreslase (ETH)	Fatima Ezzahra Gardadi (MAR)
2025 Tokyo	Peres Jepchirchir (KEN)	Tigst Assefa (ETH)	Julia Paternain (URU)

=== 10 km walk ===
Championships	Gold	Silver	Bronze
1987 Rome	Irina Strakhova (URS)	Kerry Saxby-Junna (AUS)	Yan Hong (CHN)
1991 Tokyo	Alina Ivanova (URS)	Madelein Svensson (SWE)	Sari Essayah (FIN)
1993 Stuttgart	Sari Essayah (FIN)	Ileana Salvador (ITA)	Encarna Granados (ESP)
1995 Gothenburg	Irina Stankina (RUS)	Annarita Sidoti (ITA)	Yelena Nikolayeva (RUS)
1997 Athens	Annarita Sidoti (ITA)	Olga Kardopoltseva (BLR)	Valentina Tsybulskaya (BLR)

=== 20 km walk ===
Championships	Gold	Silver	Bronze
1999 Seville	Liu Hongyu (CHN)	Wang Yan (CHN)	Kerry Saxby-Junna (AUS)
2001 Edmonton	Olimpiada Ivanova (RUS)	Valentina Tsybulskaya (BLR)	Elisabetta Perrone (ITA)
2003 Saint-Denis	Yelena Nikolayeva (RUS)	Gillian O'Sullivan (IRL)	Valentina Tsybulskaya (BLR)
2005 Helsinki	Olimpiada Ivanova (RUS)	Ryta Turava (BLR)	Susana Feitor (POR)
2007 Osaka	Olga Kaniskina (RUS)	Tatyana Shemyakina (RUS)	María Vasco (ESP)
2009 Berlin	Olga Kaniskina (RUS)	Olive Loughnane (IRL)	Liu Hong (CHN)
2011 Daegu	Liu Hong (CHN)	Elisa Rigaudo (ITA)	Qieyang Shenjie (CHN)
2013 Moscow	Liu Hong (CHN)	Sun Huanhuan (CHN)	Elisa Rigaudo (ITA)
2015 Beijing	Liu Hong (CHN)	Lü Xiuzhi (CHN)	Lyudmyla Olyanovska (UKR)
2017 London	Yang Jiayu (CHN)	Lupita González (MEX)	Antonella Palmisano (ITA)
2019 Doha	Liu Hong (CHN)	Qieyang Shenjie (CHN)	Yang Liujing (CHN)
2022 Eugene	Kimberly García (PER)	Katarzyna Zdziebło (POL)	Qieyang Shijie (CHN)
2023 Budapest	María Pérez (ESP)	Jemima Montag (AUS)	Antonella Palmisano (ITA)
2025 Tokyo	María Pérez (ESP)	Alegna González (MEX)	Nanako Fujii (JPN)

=== 35 km walk ===
Championships	Gold	Silver	Bronze
2022 Eugene	Kimberly García (PER)	Katarzyna Zdziebło (POL)	Qieyang Shijie (CHN)
2023 Budapest	María Pérez (ESP)	Kimberly García (PER)	Antigoni Ntrismpioti (GRE)
2025 Tokyo	María Pérez (ESP)	Antonella Palmisano (ITA)	Paula Milena Torres (ECU)

=== 50 km walk ===
Championships	Gold	Silver	Bronze
2017 London	Inês Henriques (POR)	Yin Hang (CHN)	Yang Shuqing (CHN)
2019 Doha	Liang Rui (CHN)	Li Maocuo (CHN)	Eleonora Giorgi (ITA)

== Field ==
=== High jump ===
Championships	Gold	Silver	Bronze
1983 Helsinki	Tamara Bykova (URS)	Ulrike Meyfarth (FRG)	Louise Ritter (USA)
1987 Rome	Stefka Kostadinova (BUL)	Tamara Bykova (URS)	Susanne Beyer (GDR)
1991 Tokyo	Heike Henkel (GER)	Yelena Yelesina (URS)	Inha Babakova (URS)
1993 Stuttgart	Ioamnet Quintero (CUB)	Silvia Costa (CUB)	Sigrid Kirchmann (AUT)
1995 Gothenburg	Stefka Kostadinova (BUL)	Alina Astafei (GER)	Inha Babakova (UKR)
1997 Athens	Hanne Haugland (NOR)	Inha Babakova (UKR) Olga Kaliturina (RUS)	none awarded
1999 Seville	Inha Babakova (UKR)	Yelena Yelesina (RUS)	Svetlana Lapina (RUS)
2001 Edmonton	Hestrie Cloete (RSA)	Inha Babakova (UKR)	Kajsa Bergqvist (SWE)
2003 Saint-Denis	Hestrie Cloete (RSA)	Marina Kuptsova (RUS)	Kajsa Bergqvist (SWE)
2005 Helsinki	Kajsa Bergqvist (SWE)	Chaunté Howard (USA)	Emma Green (SWE)
2007 Osaka	Blanka Vlašić (CRO)	Anna Chicherova (RUS) Antonietta Di Martino (ITA)	none awarded
2009 Berlin	Blanka Vlašić (CRO)	Ariane Friedrich (GER)	Antonietta Di Martino (ITA)
2011 Daegu	Anna Chicherova (RUS)	Blanka Vlašić (CRO)	Antonietta Di Martino (ITA)
2013 Moscow	Brigetta Barrett (USA)	Anna Chicherova (RUS) Ruth Beitia (ESP)	none awarded
2015 Beijing	Mariya Kuchina (RUS)	Blanka Vlašić (CRO)	Anna Chicherova (RUS)
2017 London	Mariya Lasitskene (ANA)	Yuliya Levchenko (UKR)	Kamila Lićwinko (POL)
2019 Doha	Mariya Lasitskene (ANA)	Yaroslava Mahuchikh (UKR)	Vashti Cunningham (USA)
2022 Eugene	Eleanor Patterson (AUS)	Yaroslava Mahuchikh (UKR)	Elena Vallortigara (ITA)
2023 Budapest	Yaroslava Mahuchikh (UKR)	Eleanor Patterson (AUS)	Nicola Olyslagers (AUS)
2025 Tokyo	Nicola Olyslagers (AUS)	Maria Żodzik (POL)	Yaroslava Mahuchikh (UKR) Angelina Topić (SRB)

=== Pole vault ===
Championships	Gold	Silver	Bronze
1999 Seville	Stacy Dragila (USA)	Anzhela Balakhonova (UKR)	Tatiana Grigorieva (AUS)
2001 Edmonton	Stacy Dragila (USA)	Svetlana Feofanova (RUS)	Monika Pyrek (POL)
2003 Saint-Denis	Svetlana Feofanova (RUS)	Annika Becker (GER)	Yelena Isinbayeva (RUS)
2005 Helsinki	Yelena Isinbayeva (RUS)	Monika Pyrek (POL)	Pavla Hamáčková (CZE)
2007 Osaka	Yelena Isinbayeva (RUS)	Kateřina Baďurová (CZE)	Svetlana Feofanova (RUS)
2009 Berlin	Anna Rogowska (POL)	Chelsea Johnson (USA) Monika Pyrek (POL)	none awarded
2011 Daegu	Fabiana Murer (BRA)	Martina Strutz (GER)	Svetlana Feofanova (RUS)
2013 Moscow	Yelena Isinbayeva (RUS)	Jenn Suhr (USA)	Yarisley Silva (CUB)
2015 Beijing	Yarisley Silva (CUB)	Fabiana Murer (BRA)	Nikoleta Kyriakopoulou (GRE)
2017 London	Ekaterini Stefanidi (GRE)	Sandi Morris (USA)	Robeilys Peinado (VEN) Yarisley Silva (CUB)
2019 Doha	Anzhelika Sidorova (ANA)	Sandi Morris (USA)	Katerina Stefanidi (GRE)
2022 Eugene	Katie Nageotte (USA)	Sandi Morris (USA)	Nina Kennedy (AUS)
2023 Budapest	Katie Moon (USA) Nina Kennedy (AUS)	none awarded	Wilma Murto (FIN)
2025 Tokyo	Katie Moon (USA)	Sandi Morris (USA)	Tina Šutej (SLO)

=== Long jump ===
Championships	Gold		Silver		Bronze	
1983 Helsinki	Heike Daute; East Germany	7.27 m	Anișoara Cușmir; Romania	7.15 m	Carol Lewis; United States	7.04 m
1987 Rome	Jackie Joyner-Kersee; United States	7.36 m	Yelena Belevskaya; Soviet Union	7.14 m	Heike Drechsler; East Germany	7.13 m
1991 Tokyo	Jackie Joyner-Kersee; United States	7.32 m	Heike Drechsler; Germany	7.29 m	Larysa Berezhna; Soviet Union	7.11 m
1993 Stuttgart	Heike Drechsler; Germany	7.11 m	Larysa Berezhna; Ukraine	6.98 m	Renata Nielsen; Denmark	6.76 m
1995 Gothenburg	Fiona May; Italy	6.98 m	Niurka Montalvo; Cuba	6.86 m	Irina Mushailova; Russia	6.83 m
1997 Athens	Lyudmila Galkina; Russia	7.05 m	Niki Xanthou; Greece	6.94 m	Fiona May; Italy	6.91 m
1999 Seville	Niurka Montalvo; Spain	7.06 m	Fiona May; Italy	6.94 m	Marion Jones; United States	6.83 m
2001 Edmonton	Fiona May; Italy	7.02 m	Tatyana Kotova; Russia	7.01 m	Niurka Montalvo; Spain	6.88 m
2003 Saint-Denis	Eunice Barber; France	6.99 m	Tatyana Kotova; Russia	6.74 m	Anju Bobby George; India	6.70 m
2005 Helsinki	Tianna Madison; United States	6.89 m	Eunice Barber; France	6.76 m	Yargelis Savigne; Cuba	6.69 m
2007 Osaka	Tatyana Lebedeva; Russia	7.03 m	Lyudmila Kolchanova; Russia	6.92 m	Tatyana Kotova; Russia	6.90 m
2009 Berlin	Brittney Reese; United States	7.10 m	Karin Melis Mey; Turkey	6.80 m	Naide Gomes; Portugal	6.77 m
2011 Daegu	Brittney Reese; United States	6.82 m	Ineta Radēviča; Latvia	6.76 m	Nastassia Mironchyk-Ivanova; Belarus	6.74 m
2013 Moscow	Brittney Reese; United States	7.01 m	Blessing Okagbare; Nigeria	6.99 m	Ivana Španović; Serbia	6.82 m
2015 Beijing	Tianna Bartoletta; United States	7.14 m	Shara Proctor; Great Britain	7.07 m	Ivana Španović; Serbia	7.01 m
2017 London	Brittney Reese; United States	7.02 m	Darya Klishina; Authorised Neutral Athletes	7.00 m	Tianna Bartoletta; United States	6.97 m
2019 Doha	Malaika Mihambo; Germany	7.30 m	Maryna Bekh-Romanchuk; Ukraine	6.92 m	Ese Brume; Nigeria	6.91 m
2022 Eugene	Malaika Mihambo; Germany	7.12 m	Ese Brume; Nigeria	7.02 m	Leticia Oro Melo; Brazil	6.89 m
2023 Budapest	Ivana Vuleta; Serbia	7.14 m	Tara Davis-Woodhall; United States	6.91 m	Alina Rotaru-Kottmann; Romania	6.88 m
2025 Tokyo	Tara Davis-Woodhall; United States	7.13 m	Malaika Mihambo; Germany	6.99 m	Natalia Linares; Colombia	6.92 m

==== Medal table ====
Rank	Nation	Gold	Silver	Bronze	Total
1	United States (USA)	9	1	3	13
2	Germany (GER)	3	2	0	5
3	Russia (RUS)	2	3	2	7
4	Italy (ITA)	2	1	1	4
5	France (FRA)	1	1	0	2
6	Serbia (SRB)	1	0	2	3
7	East Germany (GDR)	1	0	1	2
7	Spain (ESP)	1	0	1	2
9	Nigeria (NGR)	0	2	1	3
10	Ukraine (UKR)	0	2	0	2
11	Cuba (CUB)	0	1	1	2
11	Romania (ROU)	0	1	1	2
11	Soviet Union (URS)	0	1	1	2
14	Great Britain (GBR)	0	1	0	1
14	Greece (GRE)	0	1	0	1
14	Latvia (LAT)	0	1	0	1
14	Turkey (TUR)	0	1	0	1
–	Authorised Neutral Athletes (ANA)	0	1	0	1
18	Belarus (BLR)	0	0	1	1
18	Brazil (BRA)	0	0	1	1
18	Colombia (COL)	0	0	1	1
18	Denmark (DEN)	0	0	1	1
18	India (IND)	0	0	1	1
18	Portugal (POR)	0	0	1	1
Totals (23 entries)		20	20	20	60

=== Triple jump ===
Championships	Gold	Silver	Bronze
1993 Stuttgart	Anna Biryukova (RUS)	Yolanda Chen (RUS)	Iva Prandzheva (BUL)
1995 Gothenburg	Inessa Kravets (UKR)	Iva Prandzheva (BUL)	Anna Biryukova (RUS)
1997 Athens	Šárka Kašpárková (CZE)	Rodica Mateescu (ROU)	Olena Hovorova (UKR)
1999 Seville	Paraskevi Tsiamita (GRE)	Yamilé Aldama (CUB)	Olga Vasdeki (GRE)
2001 Edmonton	Tatyana Lebedeva (RUS)	Françoise Mbango Etone (CMR)	Tereza Marinova (BUL)
2003 Saint-Denis	Tatyana Lebedeva (RUS)	Françoise Mbango Etone (CMR)	Magdelín Martínez (ITA)
2005 Helsinki	Trecia Smith (JAM)	Yargelis Savigne (CUB)	Anna Pyatykh (RUS)
2007 Osaka^{[B]}	Yargelis Savigne (CUB)	Tatyana Lebedeva (RUS)	Marija Šestak (SLO)
2009 Berlin	Yargelis Savigne (CUB)	Mabel Gay (CUB)	Anna Pyatykh (RUS)
2011 Daegu	Olha Saladukha (UKR)	Olga Rypakova (KAZ)	Caterine Ibargüen (COL)
2013 Moscow	Caterine Ibargüen (COL)	Ekaterina Koneva (RUS)	Olha Saladukha (UKR)
2015 Beijing	Caterine Ibargüen (COL)	Hanna Knyazyeva-Minenko (ISR)	Olga Rypakova (KAZ)
2017 London	Yulimar Rojas (VEN)	Caterine Ibargüen (COL)	Olga Rypakova (KAZ)
2019 Doha	Yulimar Rojas (VEN)	Shanieka Ricketts (JAM)	Caterine Ibargüen (COL)
2022 Eugene	Yulimar Rojas (VEN)	Shanieka Ricketts (JAM)	Tori Franklin (USA)
2023 Budapest	Yulimar Rojas (VEN)	Maryna Bekh-Romanchuk (UKR)	Leyanis Pérez Hernández (CUB)
2025 Tokyo	Leyanis Pérez (CUB)	Thea LaFond (DMA)	Yulimar Rojas (VEN)

==== Note ====
- ^{^{B}} The original bronze medalist (Hrysopiyi Devetzi of Greece) was disqualified for doping in 2016. The medal was given to Anna Pyatykh but later in 2017 she was disqualified for the use of steroids.

=== Shot put ===
Championships	Gold	Silver	Bronze
1983 Helsinki	Helena Fibingerová (TCH)	Helma Knorscheidt (GDR)	Ilona Schoknecht-Slupianek (GDR)
1987 Rome	Natalya Lisovskaya (URS)	Kathrin Neimke (GDR)	Ines Müller (GDR)
1991 Tokyo	Huang Zhihong (CHN)	Natalya Lisovskaya (URS)	Svetlana Krivelyova (URS)
1993 Stuttgart	Huang Zhihong (CHN)	Svetlana Krivelyova (RUS)	Kathrin Neimke (GER)
1995 Gothenburg	Astrid Kumbernuss (GER)	Huang Zhihong (CHN)	Svetla Mitkova (BUL)
1997 Athens	Astrid Kumbernuss (GER)	Vita Pavlysh (UKR)	Stephanie Storp (GER)
1999 Seville	Astrid Kumbernuss (GER)	Nadine Kleinert (GER)	Svetlana Krivelyova (RUS)
2001 Edmonton	Yanina Karolchik (BLR)	Nadine Kleinert (GER)	Vita Pavlysh (UKR)
2003 Saint-Denis	Svetlana Krivelyova (RUS)	Nadzeya Ostapchuk (BLR)	Vita Pavlysh (UKR)
2005 Helsinki	Olga Ryabinkina (RUS)	Valerie Vili (NZL)	Nadine Kleinert (GER)
2007 Osaka	Valerie Vili (NZL)	Nadine Kleinert (GER)	Li Ling (CHN)
2009 Berlin	Valerie Vili (NZL)	Nadine Kleinert (GER)	Gong Lijiao (CHN)
2011 Daegu	Valerie Adams (NZL)	Jillian Camarena-Williams (USA)	Gong Lijiao (CHN)
2013 Moscow	Valerie Adams (NZL)	Christina Schwanitz (GER)	Gong Lijiao (CHN)
2015 Beijing	Christina Schwanitz (GER)	Gong Lijiao (CHN)	Michelle Carter (USA)
2017 London	Gong Lijiao (CHN)	Anita Márton (HUN)	Michelle Carter (USA)
2019 Doha	Gong Lijiao (CHN)	Danniel Thomas-Dodd (JAM)	Christina Schwanitz (GER)
2022 Eugene	Chase Ealey (USA)	Gong Lijiao (CHN)	Jessica Schilder (NED)
2023 Budapest	Chase Ealey (USA)	Sarah Mitton (CAN)	Gong Lijiao (CHN)
2025 Tokyo	Jessica Schilder (NED)	Chase Jackson (USA)	Maddison-Lee Wesche (NZL)

=== Discus throw ===
Championships	Gold	Silver	Bronze
1983 Helsinki	Martina Opitz (GDR)	Galina Murašova (URS)	Mariya Petkova (BUL)
1987 Rome	Martina Hellmann (GDR)	Diana Gansky (GDR)	Tsvetanka Khristova (BUL)
1991 Tokyo	Tsvetanka Khristova (BUL)	Ilke Wyludda (GER)	Larisa Mikhalchenko (URS)
1993 Stuttgart	Olga Chernyavskaya (RUS)	Daniela Costian (AUS)	Min Chunfeng (CHN)
1995 Gothenburg	Ellina Zvereva (BLR)	Ilke Wyludda (GER)	Olga Chernyavskaya (RUS)
1997 Athens	Beatrice Faumuina (NZL)	Ellina Zvereva (BLR)	Natalya Sadova (RUS)
1999 Seville	Franka Dietzsch (GER)	Anastasia Kelesidou (GRE)	Nicoleta Grasu (ROU)
2001 Edmonton	Ellina Zvereva (BLR)	Nicoleta Grasu (ROU)	Anastasia Kelesidou (GRE)
2003 Saint-Denis	Iryna Yatchenko (BLR)	Anastasia Kelesidou (GRE)	Ekaterini Voggoli (GRE)
2005 Helsinki	Franka Dietzsch (GER)	Natalya Sadova (RUS)	Věra Pospíšilová-Cechlová (CZE)
2007 Osaka	Franka Dietzsch (GER)	Yarelis Barrios (CUB)	Nicoleta Grasu (ROU)
2009 Berlin	Dani Samuels (AUS)	Yarelis Barrios (CUB)	Nicoleta Grasu (ROU)
2011 Daegu	Li Yanfeng (CHN)	Nadine Müller (GER)	Yarelis Barrios (CUB)
2013 Moscow	Sandra Perković (CRO)	Mélina Robert-Michon (FRA)	Yarelis Barrios (CUB)
2015 Beijing	Denia Caballero (CUB)	Sandra Perković (CRO)	Nadine Müller (GER)
2017 London	Sandra Perković (CRO)	Dani Stevens (AUS)	Mélina Robert-Michon (FRA)
2019 Doha	Yaime Pérez (CUB)	Denia Caballero (CUB)	Sandra Perković (CRO)
2022 Eugene	Feng Bin (CHN)	Sandra Perković (CRO)	Valarie Allman (USA)
2023 Budapest	Laulauga Tausaga (USA)	Valarie Allman (USA)	Feng Bin (CHN)
2025 Tokyo	Valarie Allman (USA)	Jorinde van Klinken (NED)	Silinda Morales (CUB)

=== Javelin throw ===
Championships	Gold	Silver	Bronze
1983 Helsinki	Tiina Lillak (FIN)	Fatima Whitbread (GBR)	Anna Verouli (GRE)
1987 Rome	Fatima Whitbread (GBR)	Petra Felke-Meier (GDR)	Beate Peters (FRG)
1991 Tokyo	Xu Demei (CHN)	Petra Felke-Meier (GER)	Silke Renk (GER)
1993 Stuttgart	Trine Solberg-Hattestad (NOR)	Karen Forkel (GER)	Natalya Shikolenko (BLR)
1995 Gothenburg	Natalya Shikolenko (BLR)	Felicia Țilea-Moldovan (ROU)	Mikaela Ingberg (FIN)
1997 Athens	Trine Solberg-Hattestad (NOR)	Joanna Stone (AUS)	Tanja Damaske (GER)
1999 Seville	Mirela Manjani-Tzelili (GRE)	Tatyana Shikolenko (RUS)	Trine Solberg-Hattestad (NOR)
2001 Edmonton	Osleidys Menéndez (CUB)	Mirela Manjani-Tzelili (GRE)	Sonia Bisset (CUB)
2003 Saint-Denis	Mirela Maniani (GRE)	Tatyana Shikolenko (RUS)	Steffi Nerius (GER)
2005 Helsinki	Osleidys Menéndez (CUB)	Christina Obergföll (GER)	Steffi Nerius (GER)
2007 Osaka	Barbora Špotáková (CZE)	Christina Obergföll (GER)	Steffi Nerius (GER)
2009 Berlin	Steffi Nerius (GER)	Barbora Špotáková (CZE)	Monica Stoian (ROM)
2011 Daegu	Barbora Špotáková (CZE)	Sunette Viljoen (RSA)	Christina Obergföll (GER)
2013 Moscow	Christina Obergföll (GER)	Kim Mickle (AUS)	Mariya Abakumova (RUS)
2015 Beijing	Katharina Molitor (GER)	Lü Huihui (CHN)	Sunette Viljoen (RSA)
2017 London	Barbora Špotáková (CZE)	Li Lingwei (CHN)	Lü Huihui (CHN)
2019 Doha	Kelsey-Lee Barber (AUS)	Liu Shiying (CHN)	Lü Huihui (CHN)
2022 Eugene	Kelsey-Lee Barber (AUS)	Kara Winger (USA)	Haruka Kitaguchi (JPN)
2023 Budapest	Haruka Kitaguchi (JPN)	Flor Ruiz (COL)	Mackenzie Little (AUS)
2025 Tokyo	Juleisy Angulo (ECU)	Anete Sietiņa (LAT)	Mackenzie Little (AUS)

=== Hammer throw ===
Championships	Gold	Silver	Bronze
1999 Seville	Mihaela Melinte (ROU)	Olga Kuzenkova (RUS)	Lisa Misipeka (ASA)
2001 Edmonton	Yipsi Moreno (CUB)	Olga Kuzenkova (RUS)	Bronwyn Eagles (AUS)
2003 Saint-Denis	Yipsi Moreno (CUB)	Olga Kuzenkova (RUS)	Manuela Montebrun (FRA)
2005 Helsinki	Yipsi Moreno (CUB)	Tatyana Lysenko (RUS)	Manuela Montebrun (FRA)
2007 Osaka	Betty Heidler (GER)	Yipsi Moreno (CUB)	Zhang Wenxiu (CHN)
2009 Berlin	Anita Włodarczyk (POL)	Betty Heidler (GER)	Martina Hrašnová (SVK)
2011 Daegu	Tatyana Lysenko (RUS)	Betty Heidler (GER)	Zhang Wenxiu (CHN)
2013 Moscow	Anita Włodarczyk (POL)	Zhang Wenxiu (CHN)	Wang Zheng (CHN)
2015 Beijing	Anita Włodarczyk (POL)	Zhang Wenxiu (CHN)	Alexandra Tavernier (FRA)
2017 London	Anita Włodarczyk (POL)	Wang Zheng (CHN)	Malwina Kopron (POL)
2019 Doha	DeAnna Price (USA)	Joanna Fiodorow (POL)	Wang Zheng (CHN)
2022 Eugene	Brooke Andersen (USA)	Camryn Rogers (CAN)	Janee' Kassanavoid (USA)
2023 Budapest	Camryn Rogers (CAN)	Janee' Kassanavoid (USA)	DeAnna Price (USA)
2025 Tokyo	Camryn Rogers (CAN)	Zhao Jie (PRC)	Zhang Jiale (PRC)

=== Heptathlon ===
Championships	Gold	Silver	Bronze
1983 Helsinki	Ramona Gohler-Neubert (GDR)	Sabine Mobius-Paetz (GDR)	Anke Vater (GDR)
1987 Rome	Jackie Joyner-Kersee (USA)	Larisa Nikitina (URS)	Jane Frederick (USA)
1991 Tokyo	Sabine Braun (GER)	Liliana Năstase (ROU)	Irina Belova (URS)
1993 Stuttgart	Jackie Joyner-Kersee (USA)	Sabine Braun (GER)	Svetlana Buraga (BLR)
1995 Gothenburg	Ghada Shouaa (SYR)	Svetlana Moskalets (RUS)	Rita Ináncsi (HUN)
1997 Athens	Sabine Braun (GER)	Denise Lewis (GBR)	Remigija Nazarovienė (LTU)
1999 Seville	Eunice Barber (FRA)	Denise Lewis (GBR)	Ghada Shouaa (SYR)
2001 Edmonton	Yelena Prokhorova (RUS)	Natallia Sazanovich (BLR)	Shelia Burrell (USA)
2003 Saint-Denis	Carolina Klüft (SWE)	Eunice Barber (FRA)	Natallia Sazanovich (BLR)
2005 Helsinki	Carolina Klüft (SWE)	Eunice Barber (FRA)	Margaret Simpson (GHA)
2007 Osaka	Carolina Klüft (SWE)	Lyudmyla Blonska (UKR)	Kelly Sotherton (GBR)
2009 Berlin	Jessica Ennis (GBR)	Jennifer Oeser (GER)	Kamila Chudzik (POL)
2011 Daegu	Jessica Ennis (GBR)	Jennifer Oeser (GER)	Karolina Tymińska (POL)
2013 Moscow	Hanna Melnychenko (UKR)	Brianne Theisen-Eaton (CAN)	Dafne Schippers (NED)
2015 Beijing	Jessica Ennis-Hill (GBR)	Brianne Theisen-Eaton (CAN)	Laura Ikauniece-Admidiņa (LAT)
2017 London	Nafissatou Thiam (BEL)	Carolin Schäfer (GER)	Anouk Vetter (NED)
2019 Doha	Katarina Johnson-Thompson (GBR)	Nafissatou Thiam (BEL)	Verena Preiner (AUT)
2022 Eugene	Nafissatou Thiam (BEL)	Anouk Vetter (NED)	Anna Hall (USA)
2023 Budapest	Katarina Johnson-Thompson (GBR)	Anna Hall (USA)	Anouk Vetter (NED)
2025 Tokyo	Anna Hall (USA)	Kate O'Connor (IRL)	Taliyah Brooks (USA) Katarina Johnson-Thompson (GBR)

==== Medal table ====
Rank	Nation	Gold	Silver	Bronze	Total
1	Great Britain (GBR)	5	2	2	9
2	United States (USA)	3	1	4	8
3	Sweden (SWE)	3	0	0	3
4	Germany (GER)	2	4	0	6
5	Belgium (BEL)	2	1	0	3
6	France (FRA)	1	2	0	3
7	East Germany (GDR)	1	1	1	3
8	Russia (RUS)	1	1	0	2
8	Ukraine (UKR)	1	1	0	2
10	Syria (SYR)	1	0	1	2
11	Canada (CAN)	0	2	0	2
12	Netherlands (NED)	0	1	3	4
13	Belarus (BLR)	0	1	2	3
14	Soviet Union (URS)	0	1	1	2
15	Ireland (IRL)	0	1	0	1
15	Romania (ROU)	0	1	0	1
17	Poland (POL)	0	0	2	2
18	Austria (AUT)	0	0	1	1
18	Ghana (GHA)	0	0	1	1
18	Hungary (HUN)	0	0	1	1
18	Latvia (LAT)	0	0	1	1
18	Lithuania (LTU)	0	0	1	1
Totals (22 entries)		20	20	21	61

== See also ==
- List of Olympic medalists in athletics (women)
- List of World Championships in Athletics medalists (men)
