= 1999 World Championships in Athletics – Women's marathon =

The Women's marathon event at the 1999 World Championships in Seville, Spain, was held on Sunday August 29, 1999.

== Medalists ==
| Gold | Jong Song-ok; North Korea (PRK) |
| Silver | Ari Ichihashi; Japan (JPN) |
| Bronze | Lidia Șimon; Romania (ROM) |

== Abbreviations ==
- All times shown are in hours:minutes:seconds

| DNS | did not start |
| NM | no mark |
| WR | world record |
| AR | area record |
| NR | national record |
| PB | personal best |
| SB | season best |

== Records ==
Standing records prior to the 1999 World Athletics Championships
| World record | Tegla Loroupe (KEN) | 2:20:47 | April 19, 1998 | Rotterdam, Netherlands |
| Event record | Rosa Mota (POR) | 2:25:17 | August 29, 1987 | Rome, Italy |
| Season best | Tegla Loroupe (KEN) | 2:22:48 | April 18, 1999 | Rotterdam, Netherlands |

== Intermediates ==
| Rank | Number | Athlete | Time |
5 KILOMETRES
| 1 | 803 | Lidia Șimon (ROM) | 17:58 |
| 2 | 578 | Ari Ichihashi (JPN) | 17:58 |
| 3 | 579 | Mayumi Ichikawa (JPN) | 17:58 |
| 4 | 601 | Esther Wanjiru (KEN) | 17:58 |
| 5 | 167 | Sun Yingjie (CHN) | 17:58 |
10 KILOMETRES
| 1 | 601 | Esther Wanjiru (KEN) | 35:26 |
| 2 | 785 | Anuța Cătună (ROM) | 35:26 |
| 3 | 578 | Ari Ichihashi (JPN) | 35:26 |
| 4 | 308 | Fatuma Roba (ETH) | 35:26 |
| 5 | 167 | Sun Yingjie (CHN) | 35:26 |
15 KILOMETRES
| 1 | 803 | Lidia Șimon (ROM) | 53:06 |
| 2 | 601 | Esther Wanjiru (KEN) | 53:06 |
| 3 | 302 | Elfenesh Alemu (ETH) | 53:06 |
| 4 | 575 | Junko Asari (JPN) | 53:06 |
| 5 | 763 | Manuela Machado (POR) | 53:06 |
20 KILOMETRES
| 1 | 308 | Fatuma Roba (ETH) | 1:10:34 |
| 2 | 37 | Kerryn McCann (AUS) | 1:10:34 |
| 3 | 578 | Ari Ichihashi (JPN) | 1:10:34 |
| 4 | 575 | Junko Asari (JPN) | 1:10:34 |
| 5 | 601 | Esther Wanjiru (KEN) | 1:10:34 |
HALF MARATHON
| 1 | 763 | Manuela Machado (POR) | 1:14:30 |
| 2 | 601 | Esther Wanjiru (KEN) | 1:14:30 |
| 3 | 578 | Ari Ichihashi (JPN) | 1:14:30 |
| 4 | 803 | Lidia Șimon (ROM) | 1:14:30 |
| 5 | 167 | Sun Yingjie (CHN) | 1:14:30 |
25 KILOMETRES
| 1 | 803 | Lidia Șimon (ROM) | 1:28:28 |
| 2 | 601 | Esther Wanjiru (KEN) | 1:28:29 |
| 3 | 772 | Jong Song-ok (PRK) | 1:28:29 |
| 4 | 588 | Kayoko Obata (JPN) | 1:28:29 |
| 5 | 167 | Sun Yingjie (CHN) | 1:28:29 |
30 KILOMETRES
| 1 | 167 | Sun Yingjie (CHN) | 1:46:03 |
| 2 | 308 | Fatuma Roba (ETH) | 1:46:03 |
| 3 | 803 | Lidia Șimon (ROM) | 1:46:03 |
| 4 | 578 | Ari Ichihashi (JPN) | 1:46:03 |
| 5 | 601 | Esther Wanjiru (KEN) | 1:46:03 |
35 KILOMETRES
| 1 | 308 | Fatuma Roba (ETH) | 2:02:51 |
| 2 | 578 | Ari Ichihashi (JPN) | 2:02:53 |
| 3 | 772 | Jong Song-ok (PRK) | 2:02:54 |
| 4 | 803 | Lidia Șimon (ROM) | 2:02:54 |
| 5 | 167 | Sun Yingjie (CHN) | 2:03:17 |
40 KILOMETRES
| 1 | 578 | Ari Ichihashi (JPN) | 2:19:38 |
| 2 | 772 | Jong Song-ok (PRK) | 2:19:39 |
| 3 | 308 | Fatuma Roba (ETH) | 2:20:00 |
| 4 | 803 | Lidia Șimon (ROM) | 2:20:03 |
| 5 | 423 | Sonja Krolik (GER) | 2:21:18 |

== Final ranking ==
| Rank | Athlete | Time | Note |
|---|---|---|---|
| 1st place, gold medalist(s) | Jong Song-ok (PRK) | 2:26:59 | NR |
| 2nd place, silver medalist(s) | Ari Ichihashi (JPN) | 2:27:02 | PB |
| 3rd place, bronze medalist(s) | Lidia Șimon (ROM) | 2:27:41 | |
| 4 | Fatuma Roba (ETH) | 2:28:04 | |
| 5 | Elfenesh Alemu (ETH) | 2:28:52 | PB |
| 6 | Sonja Krolik (GER) | 2:28:55 | |
| 7 | Manuela Machado (POR) | 2:29:11 | |
| 8 | Kayoko Obata (JPN) | 2:29:11 | |
| 9 | Claudia Dreher (GER) | 2:29:22 | |
| 10 | Kim Chang-ok (PRK) | 2:29:26 | |
| 11 | Esther Wanjiru (KEN) | 2:29:36 | |
| 12 | Sun Yingjie (CHN) | 2:30:12 | SB |
| 13 | Florina Pană (ROM) | 2:30:28 | |
| 14 | Firaya Sultanova-Zhdanova (RUS) | 2:30:45 | PB |
| 15 | Ana Isabel Alonso (ESP) | 2:31:38 | |
| 16 | Junko Asari (JPN) | 2:31:39 | |
| 17 | Mayumi Ichikawa (JPN) | 2:32:01 | |
| 18 | Marie Söderström-Lundberg (SWE) | 2:35:25 | |
| 19 | Constantina Diță (ROM) | 2:36:28 | |
| 20 | Silvana Trampuz (AUS) | 2:36:49 | |
| 21 | Mónica Pont (ESP) | 2:36:57 | |
| 22 | Manuela Veith (GER) | 2:37:24 | |
| 23 | Kerryn McCann (AUS) | 2:38:31 | |
| 24 | Anke Laws (GER) | 2:38:57 | |
| 25 | Alina Gherasim (ROM) | 2:39:29 | |
| 26 | Gadissie Edatto (ETH) | 2:40:03 | |
| 27 | Elizabeth Mongudhi (NAM) | 2:40:07 | |
| 28 | Angelines Rodríguez (ESP) | 2:40:10 | |
| 29 | Zinaida Semenova (RUS) | 2:41:33 | |
| 30 | Jane Salumäe (EST) | 2:41:50 | |
| 31 | Fátima Silva (POR) | 2:42:55 | |
| 32 | Marie Boyd (USA) | 2:44:16 | |
| 33 | María Luisa Muñoz (ESP) | 2:45:00 | |
| 34 | Lete Yesus Berehe (ETH) | 2:45:28 | |
| 35 | María Trujillo (USA) | 2:46:36 | |
| 36 | Mary Lynn Currier (USA) | 2:48:05 | |
| 37 | Mimi Corcoran (USA) | 2:49:21 | |
| 38 | Cindy Keeler (USA) | 2:53:04 | |
| 39 | Sarah Mahlangu (RSA) | 2:54:12 | |
| 40 | Anna Markelova (TKM) | 2:58:04 | PB |
| 41 | Gina Coello (HON) | 2:58:11 | NR |
| 42 | Gulsara Dadabayeva (TJK) | 3:23:01 | |
DID NOT FINISH (DNF)
| — | Anuța Cătună (ROM) | DNF | |
| — | Yelena Gundelakh (RUS) | DNF | |
| — | Nicole Carroll (AUS) | DNF | |
| — | Maria Polyzou (GRE) | DNF | |
| — | Elizabeth McCaul (RSA) | DNF | |
| — | Abeba Tolla (ETH) | DNF | |
| — | Christine Mallo (FRA) | DNF | |
| — | Heather Turland (AUS) | DNF | |
| — | Irina Timofeyeva (RUS) | DNF | |
DID NOT START (DNS)
| — | Franca Fiacconi (ITA) | DNS | |
| — | Colleen De Reuck (RSA) | DNS | |
| — | Naoko Takahashi (JPN) | DNS | |

== See also ==
- 1998 Women's European Championships Marathon (Budapest)
- 1999 World Marathon Cup
- 2000 Women's Olympic Marathon (Sydney)
- 2002 Women's European Championships Marathon (Munich)
