= Li Ying'ai =

Li Ying'ai (李英愛) may refer to:

- Lee Young-ae (李英愛) (born 1971), South Korean actress
- Ri Yong-ae (李英愛) (born 1965), North Korean long jumper
- Lei Ying Oi (李英愛), fictional character in the TVB drama series Life on the Line, a member of the Heung family
