= Linda Staudt =

Canadian long-distance runner

Linda Staudt (born August 29, 1958 in Windsor, Ontario) is a retired female long-distance runner from Canada. She won the 1981 edition of the Tokyo International Women's Marathon, clocking a total time of 2:34:28.

She is now serving as the Director for the London District Catholic School Board.

== Achievements ==
Year	Competition	Venue	Position	Event	Notes
Representing Canada
1980	London Marathon	London, United Kingdom	3rd	Marathon	2:37:39
1981	Montreal International Marathon	Montreal, Canada	1st	Marathon	2:33:32.8
1981	Tokyo Marathon	Tokyo, Japan	1st	Marathon	2:34:28
