= Kayoko Obata =

Japanese long-distance runner

Kayoko Obata (小幡 佳代子, Obata Kayoko; born September 18, 1971) is a female long-distance runner from Japan. She set her personal best in the women's marathon on January 30, 2000 in Osaka, clocking 2:25:14.

== Achievements ==
Year	Competition	Venue	Position	Event	Notes
Representing Japan
1994	Hokkaido Marathon	Sapporo, Japan	7th	Marathon	2:53:18
1995	Nagoya Marathon	Nagoya, Japan	5th	Marathon	2:43:22
1995	Hokkaido Marathon	Sapporo, Japan	5th	Marathon	2:42:53
1996	Tokyo Marathon	Tokyo, Japan	9th	Marathon	2:37:10
1997	Nagoya Marathon	Nagoya, Japan	9th	Marathon	2:32:01
1997	Berlin Marathon	Berlin, Germany	4th	Marathon	2:27:27
1998	Osaka International Ladies Marathon	Osaka, Japan	12th	Marathon	2:33:09
1998	Chicago Marathon	Chicago, United States	4th	Marathon	2:28:39
1999	Osaka International Ladies Marathon	Osaka, Japan	4th	Marathon	2:26:18
1999	World Championships	Seville, Spain	8th	Marathon	2:25:46
2000	Osaka International Ladies Marathon	Osaka, Japan	5th	Marathon	2:25:14
2000	Chicago Marathon	Chicago, United States	5th	Marathon	2:31:59
2001	Osaka International Ladies Marathon	Osaka, Japan	5th	Marathon	2:32:14
2001	Chicago Marathon	Chicago, United States	6th	Marathon	2:32:19
2001	Tsuchiyama Marathon	Tsuchiyama, Japan	1st	Marathon	2:54:44
2002	Osaka International Ladies Marathon	Osaka, Japan	23rd	Marathon	2:45:13
2002	Chicago Marathon	Chicago, United States	7th	Marathon	2:28:15
2004	Paris Marathon	Paris, France	12th	Marathon	2:42:57
2006	Osaka International Ladies Marathon	Osaka, Japan	2nd	Marathon	2:25:52
2006	Asian Games	Doha, Qatar	3rd	Marathon	2:30:38
2010	Osaka International Ladies Marathon	Osaka, Japan	5th	Marathon	2:40:28
2010	Rome City Marathon	Rome, Italy	13th	Marathon	2:40:28
