= Esther Wanjiru =

Kenyan long-distance runner (born 1977)

Esther Wanjiru Maina (born March 27, 1977) is a retired female long-distance runner from Kenya.

She is from Kahuhia, Murang'a District.

On January 15, 1999 she finished second at a half marathon race in Tokyo. The race was won by Elana Meyer, who set a world record, while Wanjiru scored did also beat the previous world record by timing 1:06:49

She won the Sendai Half Marathon in 1998 and 1999, and finished second in 2000.

She finished third at the 2000 Osaka Ladies Marathon, setting her personal best of 2:23:31 hours.

Wanjiru became the first Kenyan woman to win Commonwealth Games gold medal, although Jackline Maranga won 1500 metres later at the same games.

== Achievements ==
Year	Competition	Venue	Position	Event	Notes
Representing Kenya
1998	Commonwealth Games	Kuala Lumpur, Malaysia	1st	10,000 metres	
1999	World Championships	Seville, Spain	11th	Marathon	2:29:36
2000	Osaka Ladies Marathon	Osaka, Japan	3rd	Marathon	2:23:31
2000	Olympic Games	Sydney, Australia	4th	Marathon	2:26:17

She also competed in the marathon at the 2002 Commonwealth Games in Manchester. She pulled out of the race whilst leading.

== Trivia ==
- Wanjiru made a cameo in the 2000 Japanese movie "Pinch Runner" as herself.
