= Mayumi Ichikawa =

Japanese long-distance runner

Mayumi Ichikawa (Japanese: 市河 麻由美; born May 3, 1976) is a female long-distance runner from Japan. She set her personal best in the women's marathon on March 11, 2001 in Nagoya, clocking 2:27:22.

== Achievements ==
Year	Competition	Venue	Position	Event	Notes
Representing Japan
1998	World Half Marathon Championships	Uster, Switzerland	34th	Half marathon	1:13:16
1999	World Championships	Seville, Spain	17th	Marathon	2:32:01
2000	Hokkaido Marathon	Sapporo, Japan	1st	Marathon	2:32:30
2001	Nagoya Marathon	Nagoya, Japan	7th	Marathon	2:27:22
