= Junko Asari =

Japanese long-distance runner

Junko Asari (浅利 純子, Asari Junko; married name Takahashi (高橋); born 22 September 1969 in Kazuno, Akita) is a retired Japanese marathon runner.

She won the gold medal at the 1993 World Championships in a time of 2:30:03 hours. In addition she won the Tokyo International Women's Marathon in 1995 and 1998 and the Osaka Ladies Marathon in 1993. Her personal best time was 2:26:10, from January 1994 in Osaka. She finished 17th at the 1996 Summer Olympics.

== Achievements ==
- All results regarding marathon, unless stated otherwise

Year	Competition	Venue	Position	Notes
Representing Japan
1993	Osaka Ladies Marathon	Osaka, Japan	1st	2:26:26
1993	World Championships	Stuttgart, Germany	1st	2:30:03
1995	Tokyo Marathon	Tokyo, Japan	1st	2:28:46
1996	Olympic Games	Atlanta, United States	17th	2:34:31
1998	Tokyo Marathon	Tokyo, Japan	1st	2:28:29
1999	World Championships	Sevilla, Spain	16th	2:31:39
