= List of North Korean records in athletics =

The following are the national records in athletics in North Korea maintained by Amateur Athletic Association of DPR of Korea.

== Outdoor ==
Key to tables: Awaiting ratification Record not kept by Amateur Athletic Association of DPR of Korea

=== Men ===
Event	Record	Athlete	Date	Meet	Place	Ref.
100 m	10.22 (+1.8 m/s)	Kum Ryong-jo	1 June 2024	Taiwan Open	Taipei, Taiwan	
200 m	21.23	Yu Jong-Rim	17 October 1991		Pyongyang, North Korea	
400 m	46.95	Hwang Il-Sok	25 June 2000		Odawara, Japan	
800 m	1:49.2 h	Huang Myon-Son	11 April 1983		Pyongyang, North Korea	
1500 m	3:46.0 h	Kang Hyong-man	20 October 1963		Pyongyang, North Korea	
3000 m	8:14.9	Lee Gen-ho	13 August 1989		Pyongyang, North Korea	
5000 m	13:53.9	Ryu Ok-hyon	13 May 1987		Pyongyang, North Korea	
10,000 m	28:26.86	Ryu Ok-hyon	9 June 1990		Moscow, Soviet Union	
Half marathon	1:05:46	Jong Myong-chol	30 August 2003		Daegu, South Korea	
Marathon	2:09:26 (Note: Rumours in Europe say that the record was achieved on a short course)	Li Jong-hyong	19 October 1983		Pyongyang, North Korea	
Marathon	2:10:50	Kim Jung-won	10 March 1996	Pyongyang Marathon	Pyongyang, North Korea	
Marathon	2:10:52	Koh Chun-son	16 March 1980		Essonne, France	
110 m hurdles	14.15	Cha Won-Bok	June 1990		?, (Eastern Europe)	
400 m hurdles	53.30	Choi Chang-Sun	2 June 1985		Sofia, Bulgaria	
3000 m steeplechase	8:53.8	Ju Il-Myong	3 April 1994		Pyongyang, North Korea	
High jump	2.18 m	Kim Gwang-Su	25 October 1994		Pyongyang, North Korea	
Pole vault	5.00 m	Han Il-Hak	2 June 1990		Sofia, Bulgaria	
Pole vault	5.00 m	Ja Song-Gil	25 July 1996		Pyongyang, North Korea	
Long jump	7.86 m	Cha Gyong-Nam	14 April 1983		Pyongyang, North Korea	
Triple jump	16.06 m	Cha Gyong-Son	26 October 1995		Pyongyang, North Korea	
Shot put	15.79 m	Kim Hak-Chol	24 April 1992		Pyongyang, North Korea	
Discus throw	55.18 m	Kim Yong-Nam	26 June 1994		Sariwon, North Korea	
Hammer throw	61.84 m	Kim Jin-Hwan	31 May 1986		Sofia, Bulgaria	
Javelin throw	63.82 m	Kim Chol-Nam	21 May 1994		Pyongyang, North Korea	
Decathlon	7485 pts	Kim Sam-Ryong	26–27 April 1997		Maebashi, Japan	
Decathlon	100m / Long jump / Shot put / High jump / 400m / 110m H / Discus / Pole vault / Javelin / 1500m; 10.97 / 7.25 m w / 13.24 m / 2.04 m / 48.91 / 15.48 / 37.20 m / 4.50 m / 46.46 m / 4:44.33					
20 km walk (road)						
50 km walk (road)						
4 × 100 m relay	41.3 h	North Korea	25 April 1995		Pyongyang, North Korea	
4 × 400 m relay	3:18.9 h	North Korea	20 October 1994		Pyongyang, North Korea	

=== Women ===
Event	Record	Athlete	Date	Meet	Place	Ref.
100 m	11.80	Li Yong-Ae	25 April 1991		Pyongyang, North Korea	
200 m	25.10	Kim Chun-Hwa	17 October 1991		Pyongyang, North Korea	
400 m	56.23	Chi Jong-Ok	15 October 1991		Pyongyang, North Korea	
800 m	1:58.0 h	Shin Geum-Dan	5 September 1964		Pyongyang, North Korea	
1500 m	4:14.76	Choi Ok-Son	13 May 1993		Shanghai, China	
3000 m	8:57.63	Kim Chun-Mae	1 October 1990		Beijing, China	
5000 m	15:37.5 h	Ham Bong-Sil	30 April 2002		Pyongyang, North Korea	
10,000 m	32:02.0 h	Hong Myong-Hui	20 June 1997		Pyongyang, North Korea	
Half marathon	1:11:55	Kim Kum-Ok	13 December 2009	East Asian Games	Hong Kong	
Marathon	2:25:31	Ham Bong-Sil	31 August 2003	World Championships	Paris, France	
100 m hurdles	13.92	Kim Myong-Ok	4 October 2001		Pyongyang, North Korea	
400 m hurdles	1:01.39	Kim Ji-Ok	25 November 1982	Asian Games	New Delhi, India	
3000 m steeplechase	10:04.83	Pak Kum Hyang	9 October 2013	East Asian Games	Tianjin, China	
High jump	1.85 m	Kim Hyon-Ok	28 April 1999		Pyongyang, North Korea	
Pole vault	3.33 m	Jong Un Sim	4 October 2012		Pyongyang, North Korea	
Long jump	6.79 m	Li Yong-Ae	21 October 1991	Asian Championships	Kuala Lumpur, Malaysia	
Triple jump	13.40 m	O Mi-Song	10 October 1998		Pyongyang, North Korea	
Shot put	15.80 m	So Bok-Hui	11 April 1983		Pyongyang, North Korea	
Discus throw	51.04 m	Pak Chun Ja	27 March 1970		Pyongyang, North Korea	
Hammer throw	52.68 m	Choi Kum Ju	29 April 2015		Pyongyang, North Korea	
Javelin throw	49.80 m	Kim Un Suk	22 April 2013		Pyongyang, North Korea	
Heptathlon	5005 pts	An Myong-Wol	2–3 October 1990	Asian Games	Beijing, China	
Heptathlon	100m H / High jump / Shot put / 200m / Long jump / Javelin / 800m; 14.72 / 1.67 m / 10.52 m / 27.34 / 5.36 m / 38.80 m / 2:25.03					
20 km walk (road)						
4 × 100 m relay	47.69	North Korea; Li Yong-Ae; Kim Sun-Nyo; Ra Mi-Sun; Kim Myong-Ok	3 October 1990	Asian Games	Beijing, China	
4 × 400 m relay	3:48.18	North Korea; Chang Geun-Ok; Chang Yong-Ae; Chung Dong-Sun; Kim Ok-sun	19 December 1978	Asian Games	Bangkok, Thailand	

== Indoor ==
=== Men ===
Event	Record	Athlete	Date	Meet	Place	Ref.
60 m	6.7 h	Jo Kum Ryong	24 August 2017		Pyongyang, North Korea	
200 m						
400 m						
800 m						
1500 m						
3000 m	8:37.9 h	Hwang Chun Min	16 August 2012		Pyongyang, North Korea	
60 m hurdles	8.7 h	Choe Myong Chol	16 August 2012		Pyongyang, North Korea	
High jump						
Pole vault						
Long jump						
Triple jump	14.44 m	Pae Yong Il	16 August 2012		Pyongyang, North Korea	
Shot put						
Heptathlon						
Heptathlon	60m / Long jump / Shot put / High jump / 60m H / Pole vault / 1000m					
5000 m walk						
4 × 400 m relay						

=== Women ===
Event	Record	Athlete	Date	Meet	Place	Ref.
60 m	7.90	Choe Son-Hwa	30 October 2007	Asian Indoor Games	Macao	
200 m						
400 m						
800 m	2:18.6 h	Kim Kuk-hyang	9 August 2018		Pyongyang, North Korea	
1500 m	4:35.0 h	Kim Kuk-hyang	9 August 2018		Pyongyang, North Korea	
3000 m	9:14.53	Lee See-Nee	11 February 1989		Osaka, Japan	
60 m hurdles						
High jump						
Pole vault	3.30 m	Jong Un Sim	25 July 2011		Pyongyang, North Korea	
Long jump	5.44 m	Kang Hye-Sun	1 November 2007	Asian Indoor Games	Macau	
Triple jump	12.90 m	Kang Hye-Sun	30 October 2007	Asian Indoor Games	Macau	
Shot put						
Pentathlon						
Pentathlon	60m H / High jump / Shot put / Long jump / 800m					
3000 m walk						
4 × 400 m relay						

== See also ==
- Sport in North Korea
- List of South Korean records in athletics
