= Elfenesh Alemu =

Ethiopian long-distance runner

Elfenesh Alemu (born 10 June 1975 in Lemo Arya, Arsi Zone) is an Ethiopian long-distance runner, who specializes in the marathon race. She represented Ethiopia at the Summer Olympics in 2000 and 2004. She also competed in the marathon at the World Championships in Athletics four times consecutively from 1997 to 2003.

Elfenesh began competing in the event in 1993 and won the African Marathon Championships the following year. She took the bronze medal two years later at the 1995 All-Africa Games. She became the first Ethiopian woman to win the Amsterdam Marathon in 1997. She also won the Nagano Olympic Commemorative Marathon in 2000. Her personal best time of 2:24:29 was set in 2001 at the London Marathon, which earned her fifth place in the rankings.

She came third at the 2002 Boston Marathon and won the Tokyo International Women's Marathon in 2003. That year, she married Gezahegne Abera, the 2000 Olympic marathon champion. Alemu returned to the Boston course in both 2004 and 2005, finishing as the runner-up on each occasion. She set a course record of 1:12:57 in her 2005 victory at the San Blas Half Marathon in Puerto Rico.

She was eleventh at the 2009 Chicago Marathon and took a break from competition in the 2010 season. She formed part of an Ethiopian sweep of the 2011 Mumbai Marathon with Koren Yal and Merima Mohammed, placing third in a time of 2:29:04 hours.

== Achievements ==
Year	Competition	Venue	Position	Event	Notes
Representing Ethiopia
1995	All-Africa Games	Harare, Zimbabwe	3rd	Marathon	3:08:43
1997	World Championships	Athens, Greece	15th	Marathon	2:41:00
1997	Amsterdam Marathon	Amsterdam, Netherlands	1st	Marathon	2:37:37
1999	World Championships	Seville, Spain	5th	Marathon	2:28:52
2000	Osaka Ladies Marathon	Osaka, Japan	4th	Marathon	2:24:47
2000	Nagano Marathon	Nagano, Japan	1st	Marathon	2:24:55
2000	Olympic Games	Sydney, Australia	6th	Marathon	2:26:54
2001	London Marathon	London, United Kingdom	5th	Marathon	2:24:29
2001	World Championships	Edmonton, Canada	—	Marathon	DNF
2003	World Championships	Paris, France	6th	Marathon	2:26:29
2003	Tokyo International Marathon	Tokyo, Japan	1st	Marathon	2:24:47
2004	Olympic Games	Athens, Greece	4th	Marathon	2:28:15

=== Personal bests ===
- 5000 metres - 15:59.99 min (2000)
- Half marathon - 1:09:46 hrs (2000)
- Marathon - 2:24:29 hrs (2001)
