= Tokyo International Women's Marathon =

The Tokyo International Women's Marathon was a marathon for female elite runners held in Tokyo from 1979 until 2008 in November.

It was first held in November 1979, and this race was the first women's marathon officially sanctioned by the International Amateur Athletic Federation (IAAF). After Adriaan Paulen, the IAAF president, watched this event, he announced his support for the women's Marathon to be included in the Olympic Games.

After the 30th edition the organisers (Japan Association of Athletics Federations (JAAF), Asahi Shimbun and TV Asahi) discontinued the race, because the new Tokyo Marathon held since 2007 is open for general runners of both sexes and Metropolitan Police Department deemed it difficult to care for two different city marathons within one year.

The place of the Tokyo Women's Marathon in the Japanese race calendar was taken by the Yokohama Women's Marathon whose first edition was held on November 15, 2009.

== Winners ==
Key: Course record

Edition	Date	Athlete	Country	Time
1st	November 18, 1979	Joyce Smith	United Kingdom	2:37:48
2nd	November 16, 1980	Joyce Smith	United Kingdom	2:30:27
3rd	November 15, 1981	Linda Staudt	Canada	2:34:28
4th	November 14, 1982	Zoya Ivanova	Soviet Union	2:34:26
5th	November 20, 1983	Nanae Sasaki	Japan	2:37:09
6th	November 18, 1984	Katrin Dörre	East Germany	2:33:23
7th	November 17, 1985	Katrin Dörre	East Germany	2:34:21
8th	November 16, 1986	Rosa Mota	Portugal	2:27:15
9th	November 15, 1987	Katrin Dörre	East Germany	2:25:24
10th	November 20, 1988	Aurora Cunha	Portugal	2:31:26
11th	November 19, 1989	Lyubov Klochko	Soviet Union	2:31:33
12th	December 9, 1990	Xie Lihua	China	2:33:04
13th	November 17, 1991	Mari Tanigawa	Japan	2:31:27
14th	November 15, 1992	Liz McColgan	United Kingdom	2:27:38
15th	November 21, 1993	Valentina Yegorova	Russia	2:26:40
16th	November 20, 1994	Valentina Yegorova	Russia	2:30:09
17th	November 19, 1995	Junko Asari	Japan	2:28:46
18th	November 17, 1996	Nobuko Fujimura	Japan	2:28:58
19th	November 30, 1997	Makiko Ito	Japan	2:27:45
20th	November 15, 1998	Junko Asari	Japan	2:28:29
21st	November 21, 1999	Eri Yamaguchi	Japan	2:22:12
22nd	November 19, 2000	Joyce Chepchumba	Kenya	2:24:02
23rd	November 18, 2001	Derartu Tulu	Ethiopia	2:25:08
24th	November 17, 2002	Banuelia Mrashani	Tanzania	2:24:59
25th	November 16, 2003	Elfenesh Alemu	Ethiopia	2:24:47
26th	November 21, 2004	Bruna Genovese	Italy	2:26:34
27th	November 20, 2005	Naoko Takahashi	Japan	2:24:39
28th	November 19, 2006	Reiko Tosa	Japan	2:26:15
29th	November 18, 2007	Mizuki Noguchi	Japan	2:21:37
30th	November 16, 2008	Yoshimi Ozaki	Japan	2:23:30
