= Fatuma Roba =

Ethiopian long-distance runner

Personal information
- Born: December 18, 1973 (age 52) Bekoji, Ethiopia
Medal record
Women's athletics
Representing Ethiopia
Olympic Games
Gold medal – first place	1996 Atlanta	Marathon
African Championships
Bronze medal – third place	1993 Durban	10,000 m

Fatuma Roba (Amharic: ፋጡማ ሮባ; born 18 December 1973) is an Ethiopian long-distance runner, best known for being the first African woman to win a gold medal in the women's Olympic marathon race, at the 1996 Atlanta Olympics, and for winning three successive Boston Marathons.

== Early life ==
Fatuma Roba was born on 18 December 1973 in Bekoji, Ethiopia. She came from a Moslem family of Oromo origin. As Fatuma grew up, there were no female role models in long-distance running within Ethiopia, only Abebe Bikila. While Fatuma was at school, she was not encouraged to run but decided to continue regardless. She was coached by Sentayehu Eshetu, who had previously worked with athletes such as Derartu Tulu.

== Running career ==
She made her first national team in 1988, in the half marathon. That year she was in the top ten in the world championships, by 1992 she had improved to sixth. After coming first in the juniors and seventh overall in the New York Mini Marathon, she decided to try a full-length marathon. So in 1994, she took part in the Paris Marathon, finishing 19th, later saying "when I finished I said, Never again, never again will I do this distance, it is too long!' I drank too much water, had stomach troubles, and after 14km I was finished."

She gave up the longer distance for the following year, but with 25 days to go until the 1995 World Championships in Athletics, it was suggested that she should compete since Ethiopia was not sending anyone else. So she competed, and ran well up until the 25 kilometres (16 mi) mark, but then felt dizzy and collapsed several times. She finished 19th, with a time of 2:39:27, but her performance put her in hospital afterwards.

But Fatuma decided to continue training at that distance. She won her first marathon at Marrakech in early 1996, before winning the Rome Marathon two months later. Between the two runs, she improved her personal best time by a minute. After the victory in Rome, she was selected for the Ethiopian team at the 1996 Summer Olympics, in Atlanta, United States, and intensified her training. She later said that by the 18-kilometre (11 mi) point in the women's marathon at the Atlanta Games, she was certain she had won the race because her fellow runners were tiring although she was finding the pace comfortable. With her victory and the gold medal, Fatuma became the first woman from an African nation to win the women's marathon at an Olympic Games.

Fatuma also won three straight Boston Marathons from 1997 to 1999. The three-time Boston champion narrowly missed a fourth straight title in 2000, coming in third in the closest finish in race history. She later said "Well, for me the greatest of all marathons is of course the Olympic Marathon, but second place is Boston."

== Personal bests ==
- 10000m – 32:25 (2000)
- Half-marathon – 1:09:01 (2001)
- Marathon – 2:23:21 (1998)

== Achievements ==
Year	Competition	Venue	Position	Event	Notes
Representing Ethiopia
1990	World Junior Championships	Plovdiv, Bulgaria	16th (h)	3000m	9:26.63
1992	World Half Marathon Championships	Newcastle, United Kingdom	6th	Half marathon	1:10:28
1995	World Championships	Gothenburg, Sweden	19th	Marathon	2:39:27
1996	Rome City Marathon	Rome, Italy	1st	Marathon	2:29:05
1996	Olympic Games	Atlanta, United States	1st	Marathon	2:26:05
1997	Boston Marathon	Boston, United States	1st	Marathon	2:26:23
1997	World Championships	Athens, Greece	—	Marathon	DNF
1998	Boston Marathon	Boston, United States	1st	Marathon	2:23:21
1999	Boston Marathon	Boston, United States	1st	Marathon	2:23:25
1999	World Championships	Seville, Spain	4th	Marathon	2:28:04
2000	Boston Marathon	Boston, United States	3rd	Marathon	2:26:27
2000	Olympic Games	Sydney, Australia	9th	Marathon	2:27:38
2001	World Championships	Edmonton, Canada	13th	Marathon	2:31:10
2004	Nagano Marathon	Nagano, Japan	1st	Marathon	2:28:05
