= Kim Chang-ok =

North Korean runner (born 1975)

Personal information
- Nationality: North Korean
- Born: 김창옥; 27 May 1975 (age 50)

Sport
- Sport: Long-distance running
- Event: Marathon

Kim Chang-ok (born 27 May 1975) is a North Korean long-distance runner. She competed in the women's marathon at the 1996 Summer Olympics and the 2000 Summer Olympics.

== Biography ==
She was born as the 4th daughter of a father who works in the mining industry. She participated in the half marathon in Daegu. The athlete is an introvert and plays the accordion as a hobby.
