= Jong Song-ok =

North Korean runner (born 1974)

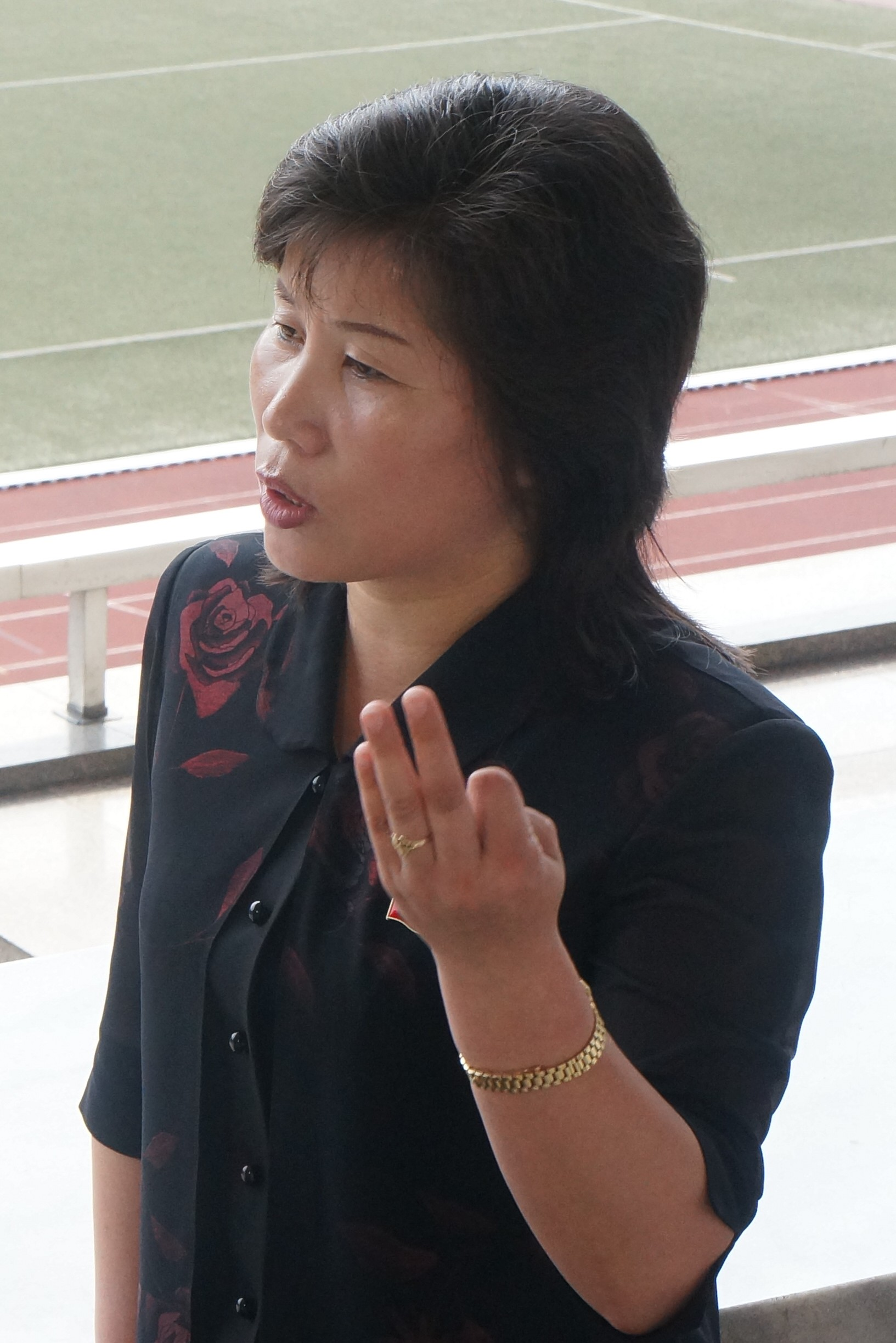
- Jong Song-ok in 2014

Personal information
- Born: 18 August 1974 (age 51) Haeju, North Korea

Korean name
- Hangul: 정성옥
- Hanja: 鄭成玉
- RR: Jeong Seongok
- MR: Chŏng Sŏngok
Medal record
Women's athletics
Representing North Korea
World Championships
Gold medal – first place	1999 Seville	Marathon

Jong Song-ok (Korean: 정성옥; born 18 August 1974) is a female long-distance runner and politician from North Korea.

== Career ==
Jong debuted internationally at the 1995 Military World Games where she finished second. She emerged as a new star in a series of North Korean marathoners after having placed third at the Beijing Marathon. She also competed at 1996 Summer Olympics in Atlanta, finishing 20th in the women's marathon.

Jong won the world title in the women's marathon at the 1999 World Championships in Athletics in Seville, Spain with a time of 2 hours, 26 minutes, and 59 seconds. Her victory was celebrated by a crowd of over one million people and North Korean media dubbed her the "Queen of Marathon".

Jong is the first North Korean sportsperson to have received the title of Heroine of the Republic. She also holds the title of People's Athlete.

== Later life ==
In 2000, Jong did not participate in either the Boston Marathon or the Summer Olympics in Sydney; South Korean media claimed this was due to the personal instruction of North Korean leader Kim Jong Il. Jong became a delegate to the 10th Supreme People's Assembly in March 2000.

Jong married fellow marathon runner Kim Jung-won in March 2001. During the 2008 Olympic torch relay in Pyongyang, she was the last person to carry the Olympic torch through the streets.

== Achievements ==
Year	Competition	Venue	Position	Event	Notes
Representing North Korea
1996	Olympic Games	Atlanta, United States	20th	Marathon	2:35:31
1999	World Championships	Seville, Spain	1st	Marathon	2:26:59
