= Ari Ichihashi =

Japanese long-distance runner

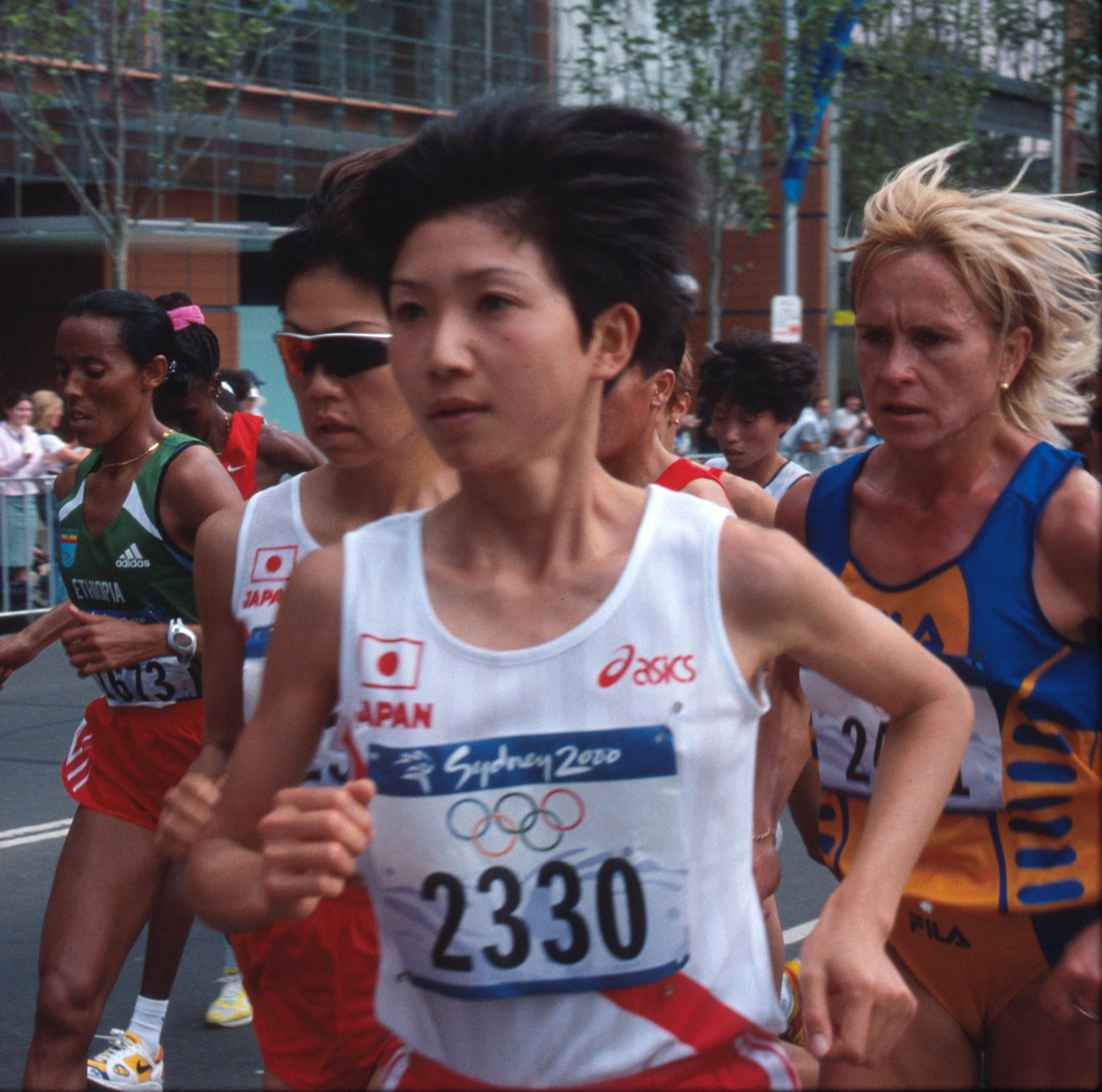
- Ichihashi in the marathon at the 2000 Sydney Olympics

Personal information
- Born: November 22, 1977 (age 48) Naruto, Tokushima, Japan
Medal record
Women's Athletics
Representing Japan
World Championships
Silver medal – second place	1999 Seville	Marathon

Ari Ichihashi (市橋 有里, Ichihashi Ari; born 22 November 1977 in Naruto, Tokushima) is a Japanese long-distance runner who specializes in the marathon race.

Ichihashi wore silver running shoes and won the silver medal at the 1999 World Championships in Seville in a personal best time of 2:27:02 hours. She finished 15th at the 2000 Summer Olympics. She entered the 2002 Boston Marathon, but had to withdraw for health reasons. She ran in the Guam Ko'ko' Road Race in 2010.

== Achievements ==
- All results regarding marathon, unless stated otherwise

Year	Competition	Venue	Position	Event	Notes
Representing Japan
1996	World Junior Championships	Sydney, Australia	18th (h)	5000m	17:02.92
2000	Olympic Games	Sydney, Australia	15th	Marathon	2:30:34

== Personal bests ==
- 5000 metres - 15:57.93 min (2000)
- 10,000 metres - 32:17.71 min (1998)
- Half marathon - 1:09:23 hrs (1997)
- Marathon - 2:27:02 hrs (1999)
