= Lidia Șimon =

Romanian former distance runner

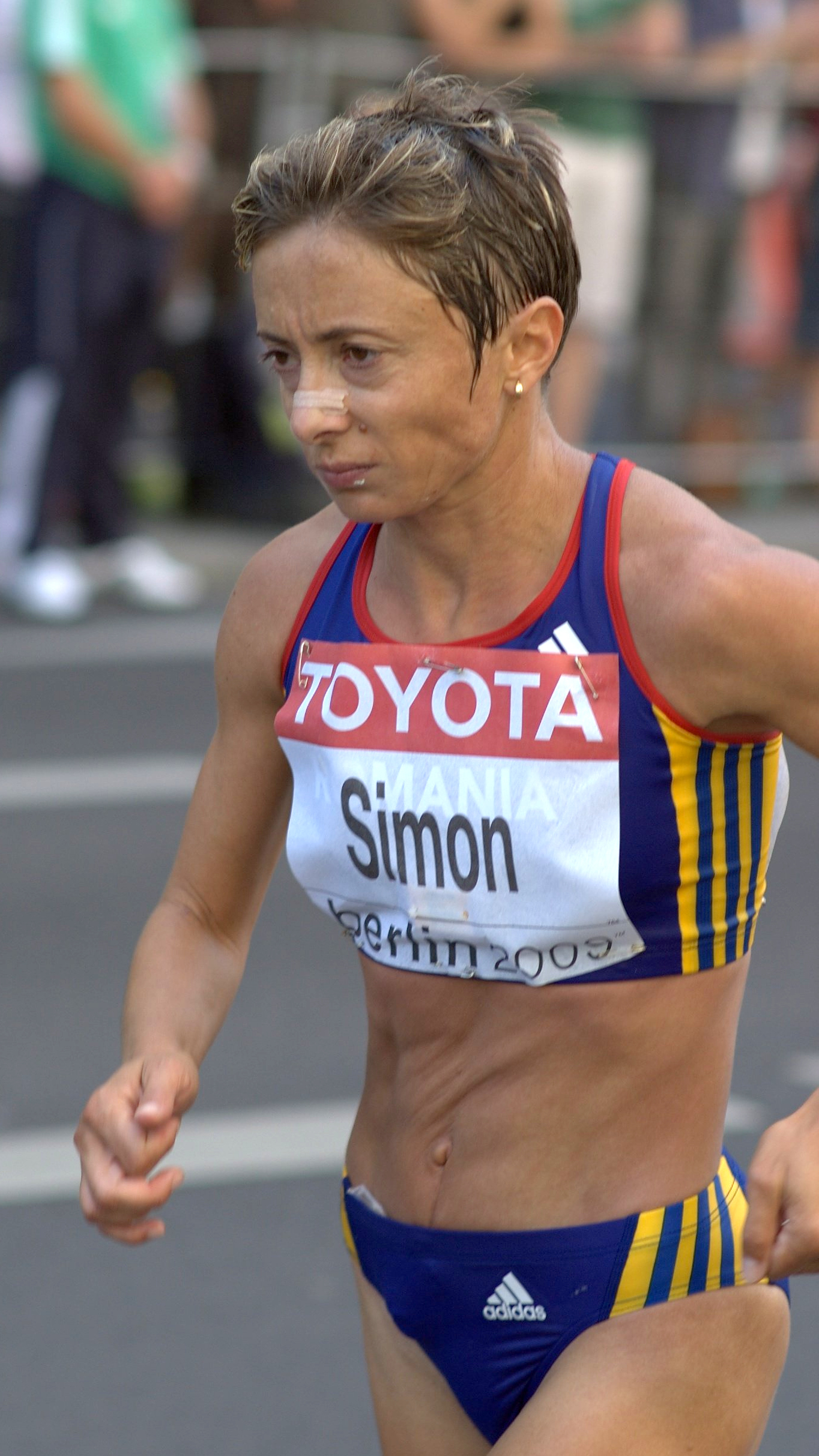
- Șimon at the 2009 World Championships

Personal information
- Born: 4 September 1973 (age 52) Târgu Cărbunești, Romania
- Height: 1.60 m (5 ft 3 in)
- Weight: 43 kg (95 lb)

Sport
- Sport: Athletics
- Events: 10,000 m, marathon
- Club: Dinamo Bucharest

Achievements and titles
- Personal bests: 10,000 m – 31:32:64 (1998); Marathon – 2:22:54 (2000)
Medal record
Women's athletics
Representing Romania
Olympic Games
Silver medal – second place	2000 Sydney	Marathon
World Championships
Gold medal – first place	2001 Edmonton	Marathon
Bronze medal – third place	1997 Athens	Marathon
Bronze medal – third place	1999 Sevilla	Marathon
European Championships
Bronze medal – third place	1998 Budapest	10,000 m

Lidia Slăvuțeanu-Șimon, née Lidia Slăvuțeanu, (4 September 1973) is a Romanian long-distance runner. She competed in the Olympic marathon five times (1996–2012), winning a silver medal at the 2000 Olympics. She is also a former marathon world champion.

== Career ==
Competing in the marathon, she won bronze medals at the World Championships in 1997 and 1999, before finally winning the gold medal in Edmonton 2001. She won a bronze medal over 10,000 metres at the 1998 European Championships.

At the 2000 Summer Olympics in Sydney she won the silver medal behind Naoko Takahashi, Japan but ahead of Joyce Chepchumba, Kenya. Between 2003 and early 2004, she took a break from running to concentrate on her baby. She returned to compete at the 2004 Summer Olympics, but she failed to finish the race. She finished the 2008 Olympic marathon in eighth place. At the age of 38, she competed in her fifth Olympic marathon (the first woman to do so) in London, finishing 45th overall.

She has been highly successful at the Osaka Ladies Marathon, winning three times consecutively from 1998 to 2000. Her personal best in the marathon came during her win in 2000, in which she finished with a time of 2:22:54. Between 2000 and 2002 she appeared several times on Japanese variety television shows, running handicap races against teams of Japanese TV tarentos. The only person ever to defeat Șimon was her own husband, who, not being a professional athlete, started among one group of tarentos and managed not only to outrun all the TV stars but to cross the finish line with 30 seconds left of his 5-minute headstart over Lidia, to a standing ovation from the Japanese audience.

Șimon has experienced much success at the IAAF World Half Marathon Championships, taking individual silver and team gold at her first championships in 1996. She went on to take individual bronze medals at the 1997, 1998 and 2000 editions of the championships, in addition to further team gold and silver medals with Romania. Her personal best time of 1:08:34 hours over the distance is the Romanian record.

She was the winner at the first edition of the combined Osaka Marathon in October 2011.

Among other achievements on the international road racing circuit, she won the Bolder Boulder 10K and Sapporo Half Marathon in 1999 and 2001, the Boilermaker Road Race and Shanghai Marathon in 2007.

== Achievements ==
Year	Competition	Venue	Position	Event	Notes
Representing Romania
1994	European Championships	Helsinki, Finland	10th	Marathon	2:36.14
1995	World Championships	Gothenburg, Sweden	10th	Marathon	2:33:18
1996	Olympic Games	Atlanta, United States	6th	Marathon	2:31:04
1997	World Championships	Athens, Greece	3rd	Marathon	2:31:55
1998	European Championships	Budapest, Hungary	3rd	10,000	31:32,64
1998	Osaka International Ladies Marathon	Osaka, Japan	1st	Marathon	2:28:31
1999	Osaka International Ladies Marathon	Osaka, Japan	1st	Marathon	2:23:24
2000	Osaka International Ladies Marathon	Osaka, Japan	1st	Marathon	2:22:54
2000	Olympic Games	Sydney, Australia	2nd	Marathon	2:23:22
2000	World Half Marathon Championships	Veracruz, Mexico	3rd	Half marathon	1:10:24
2000	World Half Marathon Championships	Veracruz, Mexico	1st	Team	3:34:22
2001	London Marathon	London, United Kingdom	4th	Marathon	2:24:15
2001	World Championships	Edmonton, Canada	1st	Marathon	2:26:01
2004	Olympic Games	Athens, Greece	DNF	Marathon	DNF
2007	Shanghai Marathon	Shanghai, China	1st	Marathon	2:29:28
2008	Olympic Games	Beijing, China	8th	Marathon	2:27:51
2012	Olympic Games	London, United Kingdom	45th	Marathon	2:32:46
