= Manuela Machado =

Portuguese long-distance runner

Personal information
- Born: 9 August 1963 (age 62) Viana do Castelo, Portugal
Medal record
Women's athletics
Representing Portugal
World Championships
| Gold medal – first place | 1995 Gothenburg | Marathon |
| Silver medal – second place | 1993 Stuttgart | Marathon |
| Silver medal – second place | 1997 Athens | Marathon |
European Championships
| Gold medal – first place | 1994 Helsinki | Marathon |
| Gold medal – first place | 1998 Budapest | Marathon |

Maria Manuela Machado (born 9 August 1963 in Viana do Castelo) is a former Portuguese long-distance runner, who was particularly successful when running the marathon. Unlike many other marathoners, she did not focus on running lucrative city marathons. Instead, she participated in major competitions (which were less monetarily profitable).

Machado participated in the marathon in every major competition between 1990 and 2000. In her first major competition, the 1990 European Championships in Athletics in Split, she placed tenth. She placed seventh in both the 1991 World Championships in Athletics in Tokyo and the 1992 Summer Olympics in Barcelona. Machado won her first medal in a major competition in the 1993 World Championships in Athletics in Stuttgart when she came in second in the marathon. She won the 1994 European Championships in Helsinki and the 1995 World Championships in Gothenburg. In the 1996 Summer Olympics in Atlanta, she once again placed seventh.

At the 1997 World Championships in Athens, Machado once again won a silver medal. The next year, in Budapest, she won the European Championships again. Although she placed seventh in the 1999 World Championships in Seville, she only managed a 21st place in the 2000 Summer Olympics in Sydney.

Machado represented the Sporting Clube de Braga. She ran her personal best (2:25.09) in the London Marathon in 1999 (and was the third woman to cross the finish line). Machado continued Portugal's successful run in the marathon that Rosa Mota had started. The women's marathon has been part of the European Championships since 1982, and the first time that a non-Portuguese marathoner won the European Championships was at the 2002 European Championships in Munich when Maria Guida of Italy won.

== Achievements ==
| Year | Competition | Venue | Position | Event | Notes |
Representing Portugal
| 1990 | European Championships | Split, SFR Yugoslavia | 10th | Marathon | 2:39:49 |
| 1991 | World Championships | Tokyo, Japan | 7th | Marathon | 2:32:33 |
| 1992 | Olympic Games | Barcelona, Spain | 7th | Marathon | 2:38:22 |
| 1993 | World Championships | Stuttgart, Germany | 2nd | Marathon | 2:30:54 |
| 1993 | Lisbon Marathon | Lisbon, Portugal | 1st | Marathon | 2:31:31 |
| 1994 | European Championships | Helsinki, Finland | 1st | Marathon | 2:29.54 |
| 1995 | World Championships | Gothenburg, Sweden | 1st | Marathon | 2:25:39 |
| 1996 | Olympic Games | Atlanta, United States | 7th | Marathon | 2:31:11 |
| 1997 | World Championships | Athens, Greece | 2nd | Marathon | 2:31:12 |
| 1998 | Ibero-American Championships | Lisbon, Portugal | 3rd | 10,000 m | 33:14.60 |
| 1998 | European Championships | Budapest, Hungary | 1st | Marathon | 2:27:10 |
| 1999 | World Championships | Seville, Spain | 7th | Marathon | 2:29:11 |
| 2000 | Olympic Games | Sydney, Australia | 21st | Marathon | 2:32:29 |
