= Ri Yong-ae =

North Korean long jumper

- Hangul: 리영애
- Hanja: 李英愛
- RR: Ri Yeongae
- MR: Ri Yŏngae

Ri Yong-ae
Personal information
- Born: 4 November 1965 (age 60)

Sport
- Sport: Track and field
Medal record
Representing North Korea
Asian Games
Bronze medal – third place	1990 Beijing	Long jump
Asian Championships
Gold medal – first place	1991 Kuala Lumpur	Long jump
Bronze medal – third place	1987 Singapore	Long jump

Ri Yong-ae (born 4 November 1965) is a retired North Korean long jumper.

Her personal best jump was 6.79 metres, achieved in May 1988 in Kuala Lumpur. This is the current North Korean record. She also holds the national 100 metres record.

== Achievements ==
Year	Competition	Venue	Position	Event	Notes
Representing North Korea
1987	Asian Championships	Singapore, Singapore	3rd	Long jump	
1990	Asian Games	Beijing, China	3rd	Long jump	
1991	Asian Championships	Kuala Lumpur, Malaysia	1st	Long jump	6.79 CR NR
