= 2000 in marathon running =

This page lists the World Best Year Performances in the year 2000 in the Marathon for both men and women. One of the main events during this season were the 2000 Summer Olympics in Sydney, Australia, where the final of the men's competition was held on October 1, 2000. The women had their Olympic race on September 24, 2000.

== Men ==
=== Records ===
Standing records prior to the 2000 season in track and field
World Record	Khalid Khannouchi (MAR)	2:05:42	October 24, 1999	Chicago, United States

=== 2000 World Year Ranking ===
Rank	Time	Athlete	Venue	Rank	Date	Note
1	2:06:36	António Pinto (POR)	London, United Kingdom	1	16-04-2000	NR
2	2:06:51	Atsushi Fujita (JPN)	Fukuoka, Japan	1	03-12-2000	Personal Best
3	2:07:01	Khalid Khannouchi (USA)	Chicago, United States	1	22-10-2000	
4	2:07:15	Japhet Kosgei (KEN)	Tokyo, Japan	1	13-02-2000	
5	2:07:20	Lee Bong-Ju (KOR)	Tokyo, Japan	2	13-02-2000	NR
6	2:07:29	Josephat Kiprono (KEN)	Chicago, United States	2	22-10-2000	
7	2:07:33	Abdelkader El Mouaziz (MAR)	London, United Kingdom	2	16-04-2000	
8	2:07:42	Simon Biwott (KEN)	Berlin, Germany	1	10-09-2000	
9	2:07:47	Antoni Peña (ESP)	Berlin, Germany	2	10-09-2000	
9	2:07:47	Moses Tanui (KEN)	Chicago, United States	3	22-10-2000	
11	2:08:02	Peter Githuka (KEN)	Chicago, United States	4	22-10-2000	Personal Best
12	2:08:08	Alberto Juzdado (ESP)	Tokyo, Japan	3	13-02-2000	
13	2:08:14	Martín Fiz (ESP)	Otsu, Japan	1	05-03-2000	
14	2:08:16	Takayuki Inubushi (JPN)	Tokyo, Japan	4	13-02-2000	
15	2:08:22	Kenneth Cheruiyot (KEN)	Rotterdam, Netherlands	1	16-04-2000	
16	2:08:23	Fred Kiprop (KEN)	Chicago, United States	5	22-10-2000	
17	2:08:30	Francisco Javier Cortés (ESP)	Rotterdam, Netherlands	2	16-04-2000	
18	2:08:33	Simretu Alemayehu (ETH)	Turin, Italy	1	26-03-2000	
19	2:08:34	Vanderlei de Lima (BRA)	Rotterdam, Netherlands	3	16-04-2000	
20	2:08:41	Giacomo Leone (ITA)	Rome, Italy	2	01-01-2000	
21	2:08:48	Willy Cheruiyot (KEN)	Vienna, Austria	1	21-05-2000	Personal Best
22	2:08:49	Francesco Ingargiola (ITA)	Rome, Italy	3	01-01-2000	Personal Best
22	2:08:49	Baek Seung-Do (KOR)	Tokyo, Japan	5	13-02-2000	Personal Best
22	2:08:49	Mohamed Ouaadi (FRA)	Paris, France	1	09-04-2000	
22	2:08:49	Joseph Ngolepus (KEN)	Rotterdam, Netherlands	4	16-04-2000	
26	2:08:59	Elijah Korir (KEN)	Turin, Italy	2	26-03-2000	Personal Best
27	2:09:00	Mark Saina (KEN)	Turin, Italy	3	26-03-2000	Personal Best
28	2:09:04	Shinji Kawashima (JPN)	Otsu, Japan	2	05-03-2000	Personal Best
29	2:09:06	William Kiplagat (KEN)	London, United Kingdom	4	16-04-2000	
30	2:09:09	Abdellah Béhar (FRA)	Fukuoka, Japan	3	03-12-2000	
31	2:09:10	Samuel Otieno (KEN)	Paris, France	2	09-04-2000	
32	2:09:17	Abraham Limo (KEN)	Amsterdam, Netherlands	2	15-10-2000	
33	2:09:18	Zebedayo Bayo (TAN)	Paris, France	4	09-04-2000	
34	2:09:23	Ryuji Takei (JPN)	Otsu, Japan	3	05-03-2000	
35	2:09:26	Noriaki Igarashi (JPN)	Fukuoka, Japan	4	03-12-2000	
36	2:09:30	Hiroshi Miki (JPN)	Tokyo, Japan	6	13-02-2000	
37	2:09:35	Joseph Mereng (KEN)	Rotterdam, Netherlands	6	16-04-2000	
38	2:09:43	Hendrick Ramaala (RSA)	London, United Kingdom	5	16-04-2000	
39	2:09:45	Stefano Baldini (ITA)	London, United Kingdom	6	16-04-2000	
39	2:09:45	Gezahegne Abera (ETH)	Fukuoka, Japan	5	03-12-2000	
41	2:09:46	Michael Kite (KEN)	Münich, Germany	1	15-10-2000	
42	2:09:47	Elijah Lagat (KEN)	Boston, United States	1	17-04-2000	
42	2:09:47	Joel Sankale (KEN)	Münich, Germany	2	15-10-2000	
44	2:09:49	Moges Taye (ETH)	Rome, Italy	4	01-01-2000	
45	2:09:50	Atsushi Sato (JPN)	Otsu, Japan	4	05-03-2000	
45	2:09:50	John Bungei (KEN)	Venice, Italy	1	22-10-2000	
47	2:09:52	Jackson Kabiga (KEN)	Berlin, Germany	3	10-09-2000	
48	2:09:55	Mathias Ntawulikura (RWA)	London, United Kingdom	7	16-04-2000	
49	2:10:00	Steve Moneghetti (AUS)	Tokyo, Japan	7	13-02-2000	
50	2:10:08	Takahiro Sunada (JPN)	Berlin, Germany	4	10-09-2000	

== Women ==
=== Records ===
Standing records prior to the 2000 season in track and field
World Record	Tegla Loroupe (KEN)	2:20:43	September 26, 1999	Berlin, Germany

=== 2000 World Year Ranking ===
Rank	Time	Athlete	Venue	Pos	Date	Note
1	2:21:33	Catherine Ndereba (KEN)	Chicago, United States	1	22-10-2000	
2	2:22:19	Naoko Takahashi (JPN)	Nagoya, Japan	1	12-03-2000	
3	2:22:36	Lornah Kiplagat (KEN)	Chicago, United States	2	22-10-2000	
4	2:22:54	Lidia Șimon (ROM)	Osaka, Japan	1	30-01-2000	
5	2:22:56	Harumi Hiroyama (JPN)	Osaka, Japan	2	30-01-2000	
6	2:23:31	Esther Wanjiru (KEN)	Osaka, Japan	3	30-01-2000	
7	2:23:44	Marleen Renders (BEL)	Paris, France	1	09-04-2000	
8	2:23:47	Maura Viceconte (ITA)	Vienna, Austria	1	21-05-2000	
9	2:24:02	Joyce Chepchumba (KEN)	Tokyo, Japan	1	19-11-2000	
10	2:24:33	Tegla Loroupe (KEN)	London, United Kingdom	1	16-04-2000	
11	2:24:36	Reiko Tosa (JPN)	Nagoya, Japan	2	12-03-2000	
12	2:24:47	Elfenesh Alemu (ETH)	Osaka, Japan	4	30-01-2000	
13	2:25:14	Kayoko Obata (JPN)	Osaka, Japan	5	30-01-2000	
14	2:25:32	Ren Xiujuan (CHN)	Jinan, PR China	1	02-04-2000	
15	2:25:42	Adriana Fernandez (MEX)	London, United Kingdom	4	16-04-2000	
16	2:25:45	Lyudmila Petrova (RUS)	New York, United States	1	05-11-2000	
17	2:25:59	Kerryn McCann (AUS)	London, United Kingdom	5	16-04-2000	
18	2:26:03	Franca Fiacconi (ITA)	New York, United States	2	05-11-2000	
19	2:26:09	Derartu Tulu (ETH)	London, United Kingdom	6	16-04-2000	
20	2:26:12	Maria Guida (ITA)	London, United Kingdom	7	16-04-2000	
21	2:26:15	Kazumi Matsuo (JPN)	Berlin, Germany	1	10-09-2000	
22	2:26:27	Irina Bogacheva (KGZ)	Boston, United States	2	17-04-2000	
22	2:26:27	Fatuma Roba (ETH)	Boston, United States	3	17-04-2000	
24	2:26:33	Lyubov Morgunova (RUS)	London, United Kingdom	8	16-04-2000	
24	2:26:33	Madina Biktagirova (RUS)	Sydney, Australia	5	24-09-2000	
26	2:26:34	Wei Yanan (CHN)	Beijing, PR China	1	15-10-2000	
27	2:26:36	Sun Yingjie (CHN)	Beijing, PR China	2	15-10-2000	
27	2:26:36	Margaret Okayo (KEN)	New York, United States	3	05-11-2000	
29	2:26:41	Manuela Machado (POR)	London, United Kingdom	9	16-04-2000	
30	2:26:42	Hellen Kimutai (KEN)	New York, United States	4	05-11-2000	
31	2:26:58	Takami Ominami (JPN)	Nagoya, Japan	3	12-03-2000	
32	2:27:00	Florence Barsosio (KEN)	New York, United States	5	05-11-2000	
33	2:27:03	Eri Yamaguchi (JPN)	Sydney, Australia	7	24-09-2000	
34	2:27:07	Ham Bong-Sil (PRK)	Sydney, Australia	8	24-09-2000	
35	2:27:14	Zhang Shujing (CHN)	Berlin, Germany	3	10-09-2000	
36	2:27:25	Sonja Oberem (GER)	Vienna, Austria	3	21-05-2000	
37	2:27:41	Noriko Geji (JPN)	Berlin, Germany	4	10-09-2000	
38	2:27:42	Alina Ivanova (RUS)	Prague, Czech Republic	1	21-05-2000	
39	2:27:52	Małgorzata Sobańska (POL)	Tokyo, Japan	4	19-11-2000	
40	2:27:55	Midori Fumoto (JPN)	Nagoya, Japan	4	12-03-2000	
41	2:27:58	Melanie Kraus (GER)	Berlin, Germany	5	10-09-2000	
42	2:28:01	Tomoe Abe (JPN)	Osaka, Japan	6	30-01-2000	
43	2:28:11	Svetlana Zakharova (RUS)	London, United Kingdom	10	16-04-2000	
44	2:28:16	Ruth Kutol (KEN)	Venice, Italy	1	22-10-2000	
45	2:28:18	Alina Gherasim (ROM)	Paris, France	2	09-04-2000	
46	2:28:20	Junko Kataoka (JPN)	Tokyo, Japan	5	19-11-2000	
47	2:28:32	Hiromi Ominami (JPN)	Nagoya, Japan	5	12-03-2000	
47	2:28:32	Jackline Cherotich (KEN)	Carpi, Italy	1	15-10-2000	
49	2:28:46	Zinaida Semenova (RUS)	London, United Kingdom	11	16-04-2000	
50	2:28:51	Mineko Yamanouchi (JPN)	Tokyo, Japan	7	19-11-2000	
