= Budapest Marathon =

Annual marathon and sport event

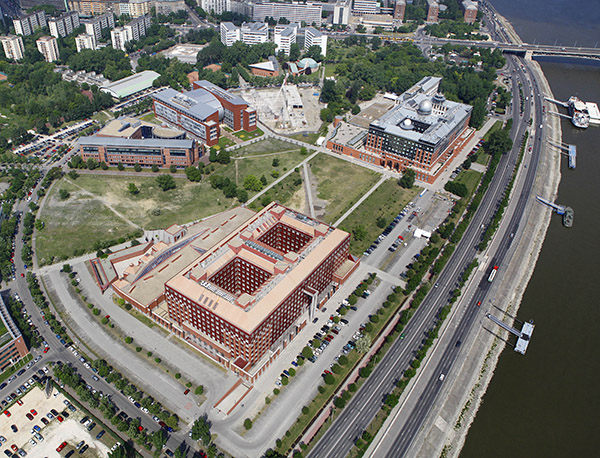
- The marathon starts and finishes in front of the Lágymányosi campus of Eötvös Loránd University
- Date: 2nd weekend of October
- Location: Budapest, Hungary
- Event type: Road
- Distance: Marathon, 30K, 10K, marathon relay, 7K, fun run
- Primary sponsor: SPAR
- Established: 1984 (42 years ago) (BTSH and BSI era)
- Course records: BTSH/BSI era (1984–): Men's: 2:15:04 (1984) (Hungary) Zoltán Kiss; Women's: 2:37:47 (2010) (Hungary) Simona Staicu; Csepeli Nemzetközi era (1961–90): Men's: 2:13:11 (1985) (Hungary) Sándor Szendrei; Women's: 2:28:51 (1986) (Hungary) Ágnes Sipka
- Website: Budapest Marathon
- Participants: 7,397 finishers (2026); 7,411 finishers (2025); 2,174 finishers (2021); 1,908 finishers (2020); 4,530 finishers (2019)

The Budapest Marathon is an annual marathon and sport event hosted by the city of Budapest, Hungary, usually held in early October or late September. The current version of the marathon has been held since 1984, although an annual marathon has taken place in Budapest since 1961. Budapest Sportiroda ('Budapest Sports Office') (BSI) has organized the marathon since 1989.

== History ==
=== Csepeli Nemzetközi era ===
An annual marathon race has been held in Budapest as early as 1961, when the inaugural Csepeli Nemzetközi Maraton ('Csepel International Marathon') was held on 29 October 1961. This marathon was held annually (Note: The Association of Road Racing Statisticians does not have a record of the marathon being held in 1979.) in either late October or early November with this name until at least 1980.

The Association of Road Racing Statisticians (ARRS) also notes that a marathon was run annually in either late October or early November with the name "Budapest" (Note: The 1989 edition of the marathon has been referred to as "Rank Xerox Budapest".) from 1981 to 1990, and considers it as part of the same race series.

=== BTSH and BSI era ===
Like many sports, running in Hungary was limited to professional athletes only.

In 1984, the Budapesti Testnevelési és Sporthivatal ('Budapest Physical Education and Sports Office') (BTSH) organized a marathon that also allowed amateur runners to compete. The event would be held in spring. A half marathon and a shorter race for school children was also held alongside the event. This would continue until 1996, when the Budapest Half Marathon became an independent race.

The inaugural marathon was held on 14 April 1984. It consisted of two loops, 21 km each. 625 men and 25 women from 18 countries reached the finish line. The results of the race can still be found on the marathon's official website. The official sponsor of the event was the IBUSZ travel agency, which remained for the next ten years.

In 1986 the Budapest Marathon became an AIMS member, the first one in Eastern Europe. The prize for winning the race was a trip to New York to participate in the New York City Marathon, provided the winner finishes under 2:18 (man) or 2:40 (woman).

In 1987, with full AIMS membership, the race attracted more international participants and the number of runners passed 1000. This was also the first time that every finisher received a medal.

In 1989, the Budapest Sportiroda ('Budapest Sports Office') (BSI) began to organize the marathon.

In 1993 the official sponsor was changed to Mars. Fred Lebow, the founder of the New York City Marathon and of Hungarian origin was the guest star of the event (he ran a half marathon).

The marathon was not held in 1994 and 1995 due to financial difficulties. In 1996, the marathon event was moved to autumn, while the half marathon remained in spring. The sponsor was changed to Kaiser's-Plus.

In 2009 SPAR bought Plus, which meant the marathon's name was also changed to "SPAR Budapest Marathon", which it remains. This year saw over 13,000 participants, with 2,388 running the full length. The number of people increased every year, so in 2016 there were over 28,000 participants, with 4,969 running the whole marathon.

In 2025, the 40th event had a total of 40,219 participants registered for any of the distances, breaking the previous record of 33,500 registered participants. This year saw 7,411 participants running the full length.

== Course ==
External images
- Course map of full marathon in 2015
- Course map of full marathon in 2020
- Course map of full marathon in 2026

The start and finish is located in front of the Lágymányosi campus of Eötvös Loránd University. The race center used to be situated at the Városliget (City Park), with the race starting in Hősök tere (Heroes' Square).

The course of the marathon changes every year, but the main routes usually remain. Due to the large number of participants a "zoned start" is implemented, where each subsequent zone starts a little bit later. It takes more than 15 minutes for the runners from the last zone to cross the starting line.

The marathon passes through the UNESCO World Heritage Site "Budapest, including the Banks of the Danube, the Buda Castle Quarter and Andrássy Avenue", as well as Heroes' Square and the Millennium Underground Railway. Runners pass landmarks such as Buda Castle, the Chain Bridge, the Hungarian Parliament Building, and Heroes' Square. It also crosses the Danube several times. There are many music performers along the route. While there are usually crowds along the route, there are several "crowd support points" where large groups of people cheer. These points are well organized (usually near metro stations) so that people can go from one point to another quickly and find their friend or family member that is running.

== Other activities ==
After the race is over, competitors can bathe in the Széchenyi thermal bath (usually for free though this can change).

== Management ==
The Budapest Marathon is managed by BSI, led by Árpád Kocsis. BSI is an acronym for "Budapest Sport Bureau". The organization always needs to delicately position itself to produce profit, while at the same time keep politicians happy. Almost every marathon has either the mayor or a minister as the "main patron" of the event. Budapest has a loud group of people that don't want the race to be held in the city center (due to the road closures that inevitably occur), which forces BSI always to be close to the party currently in power.

== Winners ==
Among men, the time of 2:15:04 time from 1984, set by Zoltán Kiss, is still a record. Among women, Simona Staicu has the best time ever, she was able to stand on the podium four times and in 2010 she completed the distance in 2:37:47.

Key:

Course record
Hungarian championship race

=== Csepeli Nemzetközi era ===
Ed.	Year	Men's winner	Time	Women's winner	Time	Rf.
1	1961	József Sütő (HUN)	2:28:21	not held		
2	1962	József Sütő (HUN)	2:23:05.8	not held		
3	1963	Sándor Molnár (HUN)	2:28:21	not held		
4	1964	Istvan Kun (HUN)	2:24:14	not held		
5	1965	János Huszár (HUN)	2:19:55.8	not held		
6	1966	Andor Bruder (HUN)	2:33:36	not held		
7	1967	Denes Simon (HUN)	2:22:19	not held		
8	1968	János Szerényi (HUN)	2:26:13.2	not held		
9	1969	Gyula Tóth (HUN)	2:26:51	not held		
10	1970	Nikola Simeonov (BUL)	2:21:56.2	not held		
11	1971	Gyula Toth (HUN)	2:21:46	not held		
12	1972	Ferenc Szekeres (HUN)	2:22:38	Sarolta Monspart (HUN)	2:59:53.2	
13	1973	Jozsef Babinyecz (HUN)	2:17:45	?	?	
14	1974	Martin Schröder (FRG)	2:15:13	?	?	
15	1975	Jürgen Eberding (GDR)	2:15:36	?	?	
16	1976	Ryszard Kopijasz (POL)	2:16:21	Sarolta Monspart (HUN)	2:48:22.2	
17	1977	Jerzy Finster (POL)	2:15:41	Sarolta Monspart (HUN)	2:48:59	
18	1978	Ferenc Szekeres (HUN)	2:16:38.8	Ágnes Sipka (HUN)	3:02:21	
19	1979	?	?	?	?	
20	1980	János Szekeres (HUN)	2:14:25	?	?	
21	1981	Zoltán Kiss (HUN)	2:18:52	Liane Winter (FRG)	2:51:22	
22	1982	Zoltán Kiss (HUN)	2:15:32	Antonia Ladanyi (HUN)	2:38:29	
23	1983	Antoni Niemczak (POL)	2:14:15	Ágnes Sipka (HUN)	2:44:33	
24	1984	Zoltán Kőszegi (HUN)	2:14:32	Karolina Szabó (HUN)	2:33:43	
25	1985	Sándor Szendrei (HUN)	2:13:11	Ilona Zsilak (HUN)	2:37:44	
26	1986	Peter Antal (HUN)	2:14:48	Ágnes Sipka (HUN)	2:28:51	
27	1987	Stephan Freigang (GDR)	2:14:37	Birgit Stephan (GDR)	2:32:20	
28	1988	Attila Sulyok (HUN)	2:17:59	Andri Avraam (CYP)	2:41:50	
29	1989	Klaus Goldammer (GDR)	2:20:58	Andri Avraam (CYP)	2:41:55	
30	1990	?	?	Anna Kamkalova (URS)	2:52:05	

=== BTSH and BSI era ===
Ed.	Year	Men's winner	Time	Women's winner	Time	Rf.
1	1984	Zoltán Kiss (HUN)	2:15:04	Antónia Ladányiné Schäffner (HUN)	2:40:10	
2	1985	Jiří Sýkora (TCH)	2:18:31	Katalin Cseh (HUN)	2:58:09	
3	1986	Sándor Szendrei (HUN)	2:16:18	Ágota Farkas (HUN)	2:47:10	
4	1987	Karel David (TCH)	2:21:15	Anikó Joó (HUN)	2:53:56	
5	1988	Radames Tamayo (CUB)	2:15:28	Ágota Farkas (HUN)	2:42:56	
6	1989	János Szemán (HUN)	2:27:16	Márta Vass (HUN)	3:05:48	
7	1990	Zoltán Gergely (HUN)	2:19:56	Ágota Farkas (HUN)	2:58:26	
8	1991	Vadim Sidorov (URS)	2:23:12	Anna Bidzilya (URS)	2:48:46	
9	1992	Géza Farkas (HUN)	2:22:07	Márta Vass (HUN)	3:00:09	
10	1993	Tibor Bárdos (HUN)	2:24:59	Sofia Sotiriadou (GRE)	2:54:57	
—	—	not held in 1994 and 1995 due to lack of funding				
11	1996	Endre Laczfi (HUN)	2:19:50	Erika Csomor (HUN)	2:56:29	
12	1997	Martón Lajtos (HUN)	2:22:02	Éva Petrik (HUN)	2:46:50	
13	1998	Gergely Rezessy (HUN)	2:15:38	Judit Nagy (HUN)	2:40:09	
14	1999	Gergely Rezessy (HUN)	2:19:31	Erika Csomor (HUN)	2:44:39	
15	2000	Mykola Rudyk (UKR)	2:19:32	Erika Csomor (HUN)	2:41:57	
16	2001	Tolosa Gebre (ETH)	2:18:45	Judit Nagy (HUN)	2:39:04	
17	2002	Gergely Rezessy (HUN)	2:18:41	Ida Kovács (HUN)	2:38:18	
18	2003	László Nagy (HUN)	2:24:39	Judit Nagy (HUN)	2:41:56	
19	2004	Jackton Odhiambo (KEN)	2:24:17	Simona Staicu (HUN)	2:38:17	
20	2005	Jackton Odhiambo (KEN)	2:22:01	Katalin Farkas (HUN)	2:49:29	
21	2006	Tamás Tóth (HUN)	2:24:27	Judit Nagy (HUN)	2:59:13	
22	2007	Tamás Tóth (HUN)	2:24:40	Judit Nagy (HUN)	2:47:09	
23	2008	Gergely Rezessy (HUN)	2:24:18	Judit Nagy (HUN)	2:45:30	
24	2009	Moses Chepkwony (KEN)	2:25:16	Andrea Szederkényi-Takács (HUN)	2:44:32	
25	2010	Ashenafi Erkoló (ETH)	2:23:13	Simona Staicu (HUN)	2:37:47	
26	2011	Elisha Sawe (KEN)	2:25:57	Judit Nagy (HUN)	2:54:45	
27	2012	Gábor Józsa (HUN)	2:21:06	Tímea Merényi (HUN)	2:49:30	
28	2013	Gábor Józsa (HUN)	2:22:58	Simona Staicu (HUN)	2:42:26	
29	2014	Tamás Nagy (HUN)	2:27:14	Simona Staicu (HUN)	2:51:08	
30	2015	Dániel Soós (HUN)	2:25:18	Tímea Merényi (HUN)	2:45:08	
31	2016	Gábor Józsa (HUN)	2:22:36	Simona Staicu (HUN)	2:50:28	
32	2017	Gábor Józsa (HUN)	2:20:21	Tünde Szabó (HUN)	2:42:47	
33	2018	Gáspár Csere (HUN)	2:20:08	Tünde Szabó (HUN)	2:47:40	
34	2019	Péter Jenkei (HUN)	2:23:21	Fanni Gyurkó (HUN)	2:42:54	
35	2020	Gáspár Csere (HUN)	2:17:43	Tünde Szabó (HUN)	2:43:39	
36	2021	Péter Nagy (HUN)	2:33:36	Anna Borisenko (RUS)	2:58:12	
37	2022	Levente Szemerei (HUN)	2:21:44	Eszter Csillag (HUN)	2:59:16	
38	2023	Mitchell Baum (USA)	2:24:36	Eszter Barabás (HUN)	2:54:17	
39	2024	Carlo Nenast (GER)	2:28:31	Ágnes Garai (HUN)	2:54:46	
40	2025	Máté Vásárhelyi (HUN)	2:22:17	Viktória Nyikos (HUN)	2:50:28	
41	2026	Máté Vásárhelyi (HUN)	2:24:01	Catherine Wimmer (USA)	2:47:47	

== Finishers ==
=== BTSH and BSI era only ===
View source data.

Year	Finishers			Shares	
Year	Total	Males	Females	Males	Females
2026	7,397	5,538	1,859	75%	25%
2025	7,411	5,463	1,948	74%	26%
2024	4,864	3,671	1,193	75%	25%
2023	3,566	2,687	879	75%	25%
2022	2,830	2,119	711	75%	25%
2021	2,175	1,623	552	75%	25%
2020	1,908	1,437	471	75%	25%
2019	4,532	3,300	1,232	73%	27%
2018	5,351	3,868	1,483	72%	28%
2017	5,415	4,052	1,363	75%	25%
2016	4,969	3,754	1,215	76%	24%
2015	5,604	4,259	1,345	76%	24%
2014	4,348	3,338	1,010	77%	23%
2013	3,991	3,196	795	80%	20%
2012	3,585	2,884	701	80%	20%
2011	2,984	2,426	558	81%	19%
2010	2,658	2,179	479	82%	18%
2009	2,388	1,962	426	82%	18%
2008	2,598	2,123	475	82%	18%
2007	2,577	2,060	517	80%	20%
2006	1,619	1,349	270	83%	17%
2005	2,792	2,296	495	82%	18%
2004	2,273	1,889	384	83%	17%
2003	2,234	1,864	370	83%	17%
2002	2,097	1,786	311	85%	15%
2001	2,089	1,796	293	86%	14%
2000	2,444	2,097	347	86%	14%
1999	1,838	1,626	212	88%	12%
1998	1,407	1,267	140	90%	10%
1997	1,068	969	99	91%	9%
1996	738	680	58	92%	8%
—	not held in 1994 and 1995 due to lack of funding				
1993	958	900	58	94%	6%
1992	879	837	42	95%	5%
1991	996	945	51	95%	5%
1990	1,000	964	36	96%	4%
1989	676	653	23	97%	3%
1988	1,097	1,049	48	96%	4%
1987	1,230	1,166	64	95%	5%
1986	889	850	39	96%	4%
1985	739	714	25	97%	3%
1984	650	625	25	96%	4%
