= Budapest Half Marathon =

Road running event in Hungary

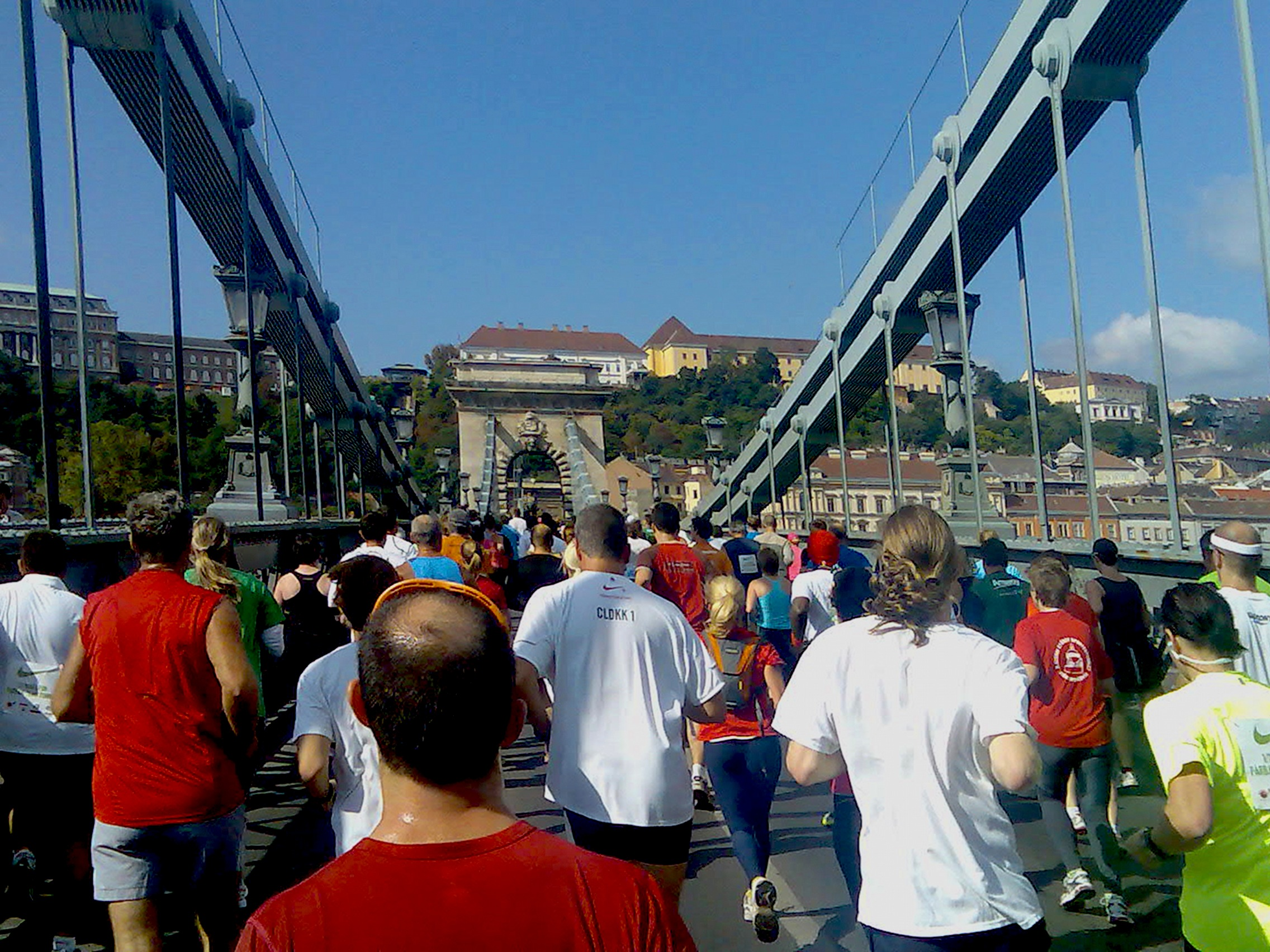
- Runners crossing Danube River in the 2010 Budapest Half Marathon race
- Date: September
- Location: Budapest, Hungary
- Event type: Road
- Distance: Half marathon, 10K
- Primary sponsor: Wizz Air
- Established: 1984
- Course records: Men's: 1:02:44 (1998) (Japan) Seiji Hamada; Women's: 1:09:21 (2026) (Hungary) Lili Vindics-Tóth
- Website: Official website
- Participants: 13,752 finishers (2026); 11,084 finishers (2025); 6,871 finishers (2024); 5,186 finishers (2023)

The Budapest Half Marathon (complete name: Wizz Air Budapest Half Marathon, Hungarian: Wizz Air Budapest Félmaraton) is an annual road running competition over the half marathon distance (21.0975 kilometres (13.1094 mi)) which takes place in Budapest, Hungary in September. The 2026 event took place on Sunday 6 September.

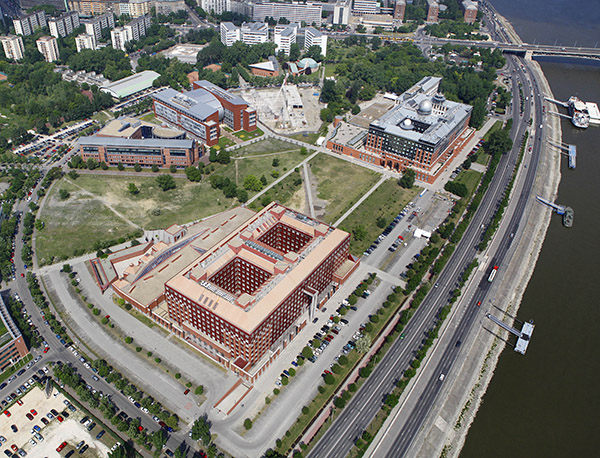
The Pázmány Péter Promenade hosts the start since 2018, overlooked by the Lágymányos campus of ELTE

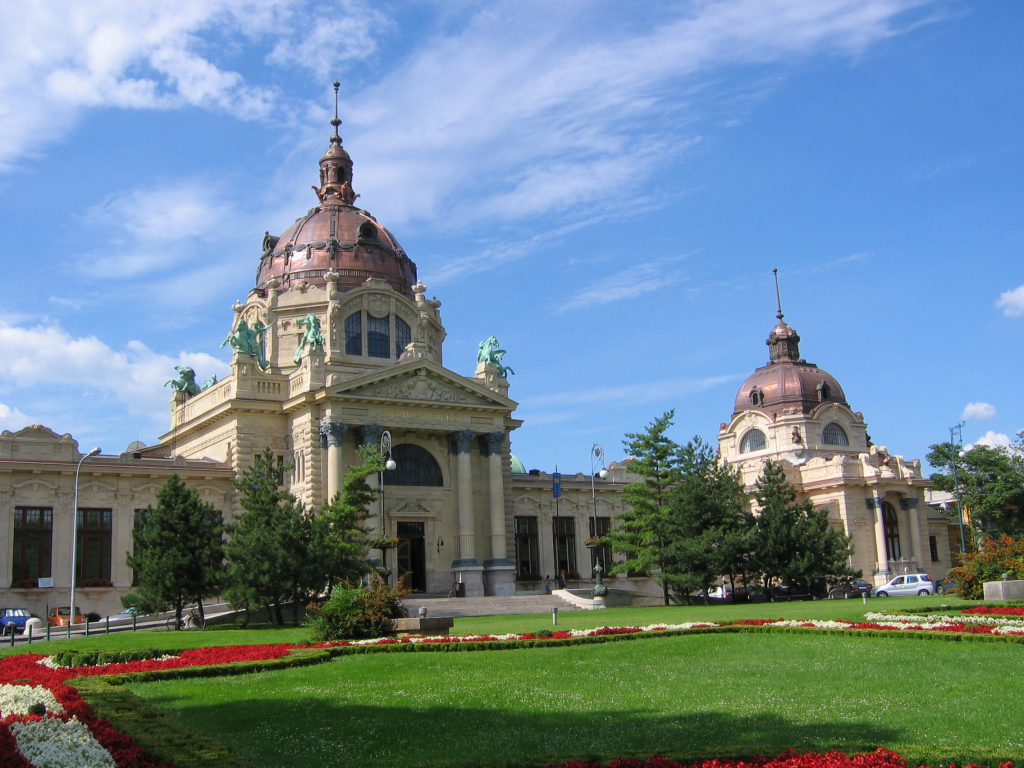
The Széchenyi Baths in City Park, overlooking the former starting point of Budapest Half Marathon

== Race history ==
Between 1984 and 1993 annual half-marathon races were organized as a side event of the Budapest Marathon. In 1994 and 1995 the Budapest Marathon was discontinued and, since it was re-established in 1996, separate half-marathon races have been held in September, with Nike as the event's main supporter. From 2014 the event has a new main sponsor Wizz Air. Up until 2018, the route has started and ended in City Park and wound through the city center, offering views of some of the city's main sights, such as Andrássy Avenue with the Opera House, the Danube from the Széchenyi Chain Bridge and the Parliament. Starting with the 2018 edition, the route starts and ends on the Pázmány Péter Promenade at the Lágymányos campus of ELTE, with most sections running parallel to the Danube. The popularity of Budapest Half Marathon has constantly increased; the number of participants having grown from an initial 3000 to over 7000 individual runners. Currently the distance can be run either as an individual or as a relay in a teams of two or three. Competitors with disabilities may compete in wheelchairs.

== Past winners ==
Source: Futanet, bsieredmenylista.hu, Half Marathon Race Guide 2013, budapestfelmaraton.hu

Key: Course record

Ed.	Year	Men's winner	Time (h:m:s)	Women's winner	Time (h:m:s)	Finishers		
Ed.	Year	Men's winner	Time (h:m:s)	Women's winner	Time (h:m:s)	Total	Males	Females
—	—	not held in 1994 and 1995						
11	1996	Zoltán Káldy (HUN)	1:04:45	Simona Staicu (HUN)	1:11:11	1768	?	?
12	1997	Keita Fujino (JPN)	1:03:14	Sachie Ozaki (JPN)	1:11:04	2535	?	?
13	1998	Seiji Hamada (JPN)	1:02:44	Kazumi Kanbayashi (JPN)	1:10:37	2703	?	?
14	1999	Takaki Morikawa (JPN)	1:03:28	Tomoko Tamamushi (JPN)	1:12:15	3422	?	?
15	2000	Piotr Gładki (POL)	1:04:45	Mihaela Botezan (ROM)	1:10:17	4024	?	?
16	2001	Sreten Ninković (YUG)	1:04:43	Beáta Rakonczai (HUN)	1:13:33	3912	?	?
17	2002	William Kipsang (KEN)	1:02:59	Beáta Rakonczai (HUN)	1:13:39	4403	?	?
18	2003	Miklós Zatykó (HUN)	1:05:53	Anikó Kálovics (HUN)	1:11:08	4470	?	?
19	2004	Sreten Ninković (SCG)	1:06:51	Anikó Kálovics (HUN)	1:11:18	4601	?	?
20	2005	András Juhász (HUN)	1:05:57	Eszter Erdélyi (HUN)	1:16:10	5466	?	?
21	2006	Barnabás Bene (HUN)	1:06:32	Anikó Kálovics (HUN)	1:10:46	4964	?	?
22	2007	Balázs Ott (HUN)	1:07:19	Krisztina Papp (HUN)	1:12:09	5020	?	?
23	2008	Pasquale Rutigliano (ITA)	1:07:22	Beáta Rakonczai (HUN)	1:14:38	4930	?	?
24	2009	Ashenafi Erkolo (ETH)	1:07:24	Krisztina Papp (HUN)	1:15:27	4848	?	?
25	2010	László Tóth (HUN)	1:04:38	Krisztina Papp (HUN)	1:13:13	5520	?	?
26	2011	Tamás Kovács (HUN)	1:06:03	Anikó Kálovics (HUN)	1:15:04	6203	?	?
27	2012	Gábor Józsa (HUN)	1:06:36	Krisztina Papp (HUN)	1:15:07	6751	?	?
28	2013	Henry Kemboi (KEN)	1:05:53	Krisztina Papp (HUN)	1:12:32	7436	?	?
29	2014	Hillary Maiyo (KEN)	1:05:05	Nancy Nzisa (KEN)	1:15:14	7783	?	?
30	2015	Henry Kemboi (KEN)	1:06:28	Zita Kácser (HUN)	1:16:51	9074	?	?
31	2016	Henry Kemboi (KEN)	1:05:40	Christine Moraa (KEN)	1:18:53	8187	?	?
32	2017	Wycliffe Biwott (KEN)	1:06:52	Zita Kácser (HUN)	1:16:59	8315	?	?
33	2018	Matthew Kosgei (KEN)	1:06:50	Zita Kácser (HUN)	1:17:47	8669	?	?
34	2019	Laban Cheruiyot (KEN)	1:04:56	Zita Kácser (HUN)	1:14:47	7969	5048	2921
35	2020	Gáspár Csere (HUN)	1:06:30	Katalin Kovács-Garami (HUN)	1:18:53	3783	2480	1303
36	2021	Péter Jenkei (HUN)	1:06:18	Nóra Szabó (HUN)	1:12:21	2998	2011	987
37	2022	Levente Szemerei (HUN)	1:05:00	Zsófia Virág-Erdélyi (HUN)	1:14:16	4175	2746	1429
38	2023	Albert Tonui (KEN)	1:04:09	Philice Cheboirot (KEN)	1:14:37	5186	3400	1786
39	2024	Levente Szemerei (HUN)	1:03:25	Nóra Szabó (HUN)	1:12:08	6870	4497	2374
40	2025	Gábor Karsai (HUN)	1:04:03	Lili Vindics-Tóth (HUN)	1:11:43	11084	6710	4374
41	2026	Gábor Karsai (HUN)	1:04:19	Lili Vindics-Tóth (HUN)	1:09:21	13752	8165	5587

"Finishers" refers to individuals completing the course, ignoring relay teams.
