= 1998 European Athletics Championships – Women's marathon =

Women's marathon at the European Athletics Championships

These are the official results of the Women's Marathon competition at the 1998 European Championships in Budapest, Hungary. The race was held on Sunday August 23, 1998.

== Medalists ==
Gold	Manuela Machado; Portugal (POR)
Silver	Madina Biktagirova; Russia (RUS)
Bronze	Maura Viceconte; Italy (ITA)

== Abbreviations ==
- All times shown are in hours:minutes:seconds

DNS	did not start
NM	no mark
WR	world record
AR	area record
NR	national record
PB	personal best
SB	season best

== Records ==
Standing records prior to the 1998 European Athletics Championships
World Record	Tegla Loroupe (KEN)	2:20:47	April 19, 1998	Rotterdam, Netherlands
Event Record	Rosa Mota (POR)	2:28:38	August 26, 1986	Stuttgart, West Germany
Broken records at the 1998 European Athletics Championships
Event Record	Manuela Machado (POR)	2:27:10	August 23, 1998	Budapest, Hungary

== Final ranking ==
Rank	Athlete	Time	Note
1st place, gold medalist(s)	Manuela Machado (POR)	2:27:10	CR
2nd place, silver medalist(s)	Madina Biktagirova (RUS)	2:28:01	
3rd place, bronze medalist(s)	Maura Viceconte (ITA)	2:28:31	
4	Franca Fiacconi (ITA)	2:28:59	
5	Marleen Renders (BEL)	2:29:43	
6	Rocio Rios (ESP)	2:29:53	
7	Lyubov Morgunova (RUS)	2:30:07	
8	Yelena Razdrogina (RUS)	2:30:09	
9	Lyudmila Petrova (RUS)	2:30:26	
10	Claudia Dreher (GER)	2:31:10	
11	Renata Paradowska (POL)	2:32:18	
12	Sonja Oberem (GER)	2:32:36	
13	Maria Polyzou (GRE)	2:33:40	
14	Judit Földing-Nagy (HUN)	2:34:00	
15	Sylvia Renz (GER)	2:34:05	
16	Christine Mallo (FRA)	2:34:19	
17	Constantina Diță (ROM)	2:34:35	
18	Irina Timofeyeva (RUS)	2:34:44	
19	Gigliola Borghini (ITA)	2:35:25	
20	María Luisa Muñoz (ESP)	2:35:53	
21	Natalya Galushko (BLR)	2:36:26	
22	Nicole Leveque (FRA)	2:36:52	
23	Aurica Buia (ROM)	2:36:55	
24	Francesca Zanusso (ITA)	2:37:19	
25	Manuela Veith (GER)	2:37:32	
26	Adriana Barbu (ROM)	2:37:58	
27	Alena Mazouka (BLR)	2:38:01	
28	Yelena Vinitskaya (BLR)	2:38:08	
29	Halina Karnatsevich (BLR)	2:38:50	
30	Paola Vignati (ITA)	2:38:56	
31	Josetta Colomb-Janin (FRA)	2:39:20	
32	Spyridoula Souma (GRE)	2:39:51	
33	Evelyne Mura (FRA)	2:41:31	
34	Nuţa Olaru (ROM)	2:42:44	
35	Maryse le Gallo (FRA)	2:43:47	
36	Erika Csomor (HUN)	2:48:37	
37	Agnes Kiss (HUN)	2:49:23	
38	Ida Kovács (HUN)	2:49:23	
39	Katerina Pratsi (CYP)	2:59:24	
40	Eniko Feher (HUN)	2:59:50	
DID NOT FINISH (DNF)
—	Grete Kirkeberg (NOR)	DNF	
—	Alina Gherasim (ROM)	DNF	
—	Muriel Linsolas (FRA)	DNF	
—	Ágnes Jakab (HUN)	DNF	
—	Ana Isabel Alonso (ESP)	DNF	
—	Vilija Birbalaitė (LTU)	DNF	
—	Patrizia Ritondo (ITA)	DNF	

== See also ==
- 1998 European Marathon Cup
