= Athletics at the 2000 Summer Olympics – Women's marathon =

Women's marathon at the Games of the XXVII Olympiad
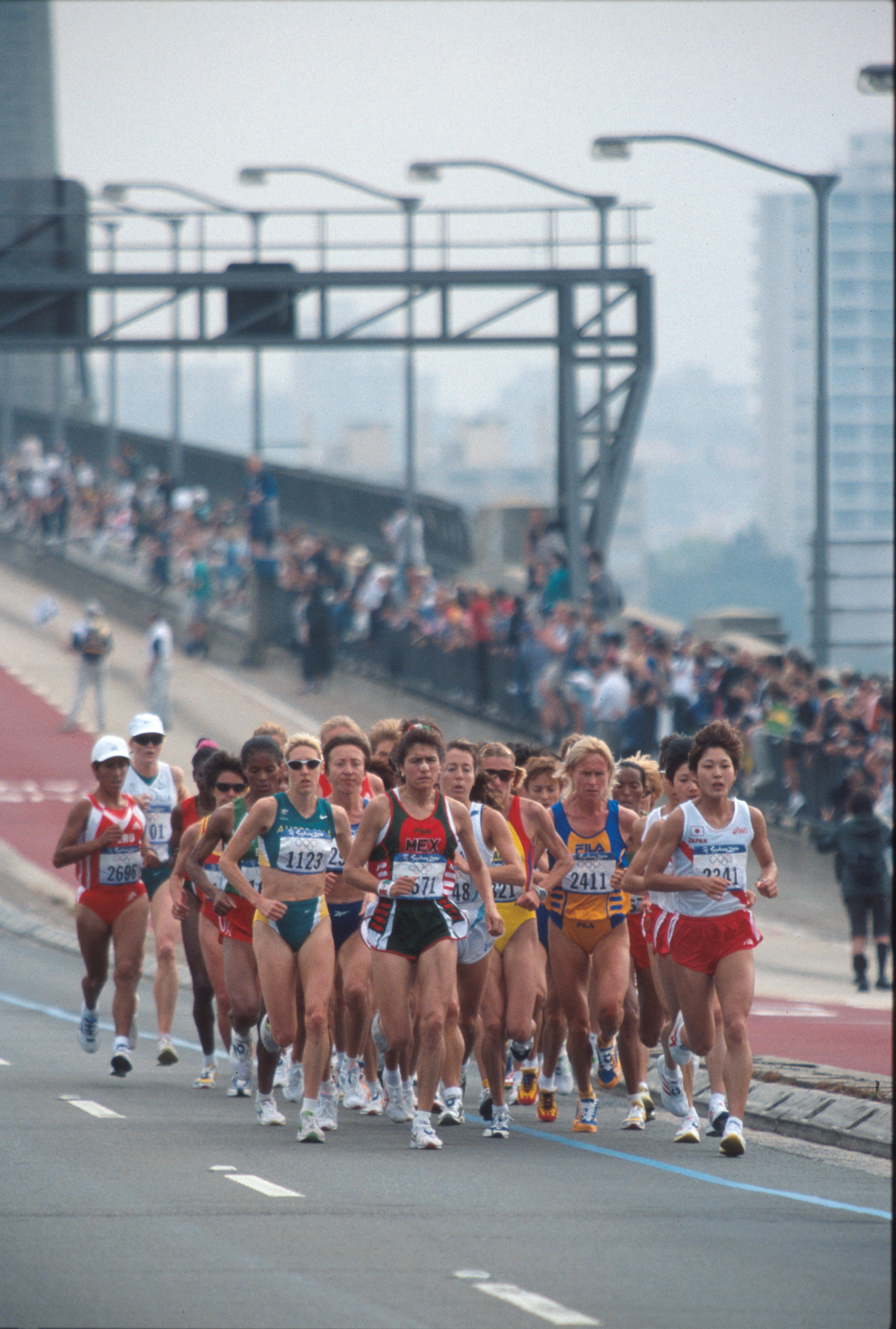
- Venue: Stadium Australia, Sydney
- Dates: 24 September
- Competitors: 53 from 36 nations
- Winning time: 2:23:14 OR

Medalists
1st place, gold medalist(s)		Naoko Takahashi	Japan
2nd place, silver medalist(s)		Lidia Șimon	Romania
3rd place, bronze medalist(s)		Joyce Chepchumba	Kenya

The Women's Marathon event at the 2000 Summer Olympics took place on 24 September 2000 in the streets of Sydney, Australia.

== Medalists ==
Gold	Naoko Takahashi; Japan
Silver	Lidia Șimon; Romania
Bronze	Joyce Chepchumba; Kenya

== Abbreviations ==
- All times shown are in hours:minutes:seconds

DNS	did not start
NM	no mark
OR	olympic record
WR	world record
AR	area record
NR	national record
PB	personal best
SB	season best

== Records ==
Standing records prior to the 2000 Summer Olympics
World Record	Tegla Loroupe (KEN)	2:20:43	26 September 1999	Berlin, Germany
Olympic Record	Joan Benoit (USA)	2:24:52	5 August 1984	Los Angeles, United States
Season Best	Naoko Takahashi (JPN)	2:22:19	12 March 2000	Nagoya, Japan
Broken records at the 2000 Summer Olympics
Olympic Record	Naoko Takahashi (JPN)	2:23:14	24 September 2000	Sydney, Australia

== Startlist ==
Number	Athlete	Country	Birthdate	Personal Best
2402	Tegla Loroupe	Kenya	1973/05/09	2:20:43
2338	Naoko Takahashi	Japan	1972/05/06	2:21:47
2341	Eri Yamaguchi	Japan	1973/01/14	2:22:12
2831	Lidia Șimon	Romania	1973/09/04	2:22:54
1673	Fatuma Roba	Ethiopia	1973/12/18	2:23:21
2397	Joyce Chepchumba	Kenya	1970/11/06	2:23:22
2405	Esther Wanjiru	Kenya	1977/03/27	2:23:31
2986	Valentina Yegorova	Russia	1964/02/16	2:23:33
1210	Marleen Renders	Belgium	1968/12/24	2:23:44
2248	Maura Viceconte	Italy	1967/10/03	2:23:47
2571	Adriana Fernández	Mexico	1971/04/04	2:24:06
2925	Madina Biktagirova	Russia	1964/09/20	2:24:46
1667	Elfenesh Alemu	Ethiopia	1975/06/10	2:24:47
2774	Manuela Machado	Portugal	1963/08/09	2:25:09
1388	Ren Xiujuan	China	1974/09/14	2:25:32
1101	Nicole Carroll	Australia	1972/01/14	2:25:52
1123	Kerryn McCann	Australia	1967/05/02	2:25:59
2411	Irina Bogachova	Kyrgyzstan	1961/04/30	2:26:27
2960	Lyubov Morgunova	Russia	1971/01/14	2:26:33
2860	Colleen De Reuck	South Africa	1964/04/13	2:26:35
1616	Ana Isabel Alonso	Spain	1963/08/16	2:26:51
2786	Kim Chang-ok	North Korea	1975/04/16	2:27:02
2330	Ari Ichihashi	Japan	1977/11/22	2:27:02
1920	Sonja Oberem	Germany	1973/02/24	2:27:25
2818	Anuța Cătună	Romania	1968/10/01	2:27:34
1903	Claudia Dreher	Germany	1971/05/02	2:27:55
1554	Martha Tenorio	Ecuador	1967/08/06	2:27:58
2232	Ornella Ferrara	Italy	1968/04/17	2:28:01
2821	Alina Gherasim	Romania	1971/11/10	2:28:18
1845	Marian Sutton	Great Britain	1963/10/07	2:28:42
2620	Nadezhda Wijenberg	Netherlands	1964/04/02	2:28:45
2070	Judit Földing-Nagy	Hungary	1965/12/09	2:28:50
1635	María Luisa Muñoz	Spain	1959/05/06	2:28:59
2784	Ham Pong-Sil	North Korea	1974/07/24	2:29:08
2427	Oh Mi-Ja	South Korea	1970/07/03	2:29:44
1669	Gadissa Edato	Ethiopia	1973/03/15	2:29:57
1625	Griselda González	Spain	1965/12/04	2:30:32
3182	Serap Aktaş	Turkey	1971/09/25	2:31:43
1367	Érika Olivera	Chile	1976/01/04	2:32:23
2785	Jong Yong-Ok	North Korea	1981/01/24	2:32:30
1116	Susan Hobson	Australia	1958/03/13	2:32:37
3078	Daria Nauer	Switzerland	1966/05/21	2:32:38
2551	Valentina Enachi	Moldova	1966/02/15	2:33:27
3334	Christine Clark	United States	1962/10/10	2:33:31
2167	Martha Ernstdóttir	Iceland	1964/12/22	2:35:15
1429	Iglandini González	Colombia	1965/02/05	2:35:19
2696	María Portillo	Peru	1972/04/10	2:35:24
2608	Elizabeth Mongudhi	Namibia	1970/06/15	2:36:44
2356	Garifa Kuku	Kazakhstan	1959/11/30	2:39:20
2025	Rhonda Davidson-Alley	Guam	1961/04/19	2:54:23
2038	Gina Coello	Honduras	1964/10/02	2:58:11
3145	Gulsara Dadabayeva	Tajikistan	1976/07/04	3:09:08
2120	Aguida Amaral	Individual Olympic Athletes	1972/05/27	3:10:00
2450	Sirivanh Ketavong	Laos	1970/09/01	3:25:16

== Intermediates ==
Rank	Number	Athlete	Country	Time
5 KILOMETRES
1	1210	Marleen Renders	Belgium	16:42
10 KILOMETRES
1	1210	Marleen Renders	Belgium	34:08
15 KILOMETRES
1	1210	Marleen Renders	Belgium	51:19
20 KILOMETRES
1	2831	Lidia Șimon	Romania	1:08:10
HALF MARATHON
1	2831	Lidia Șimon	Romania	1:11:45
25 KILOMETRES
1	2831	Lidia Șimon	Romania	1:24:48
30 KILOMETRES
1	2831	Lidia Șimon	Romania	1:41:39
35 KILOMETRES
1	2338	Naoko Takahashi	Japan	1:58:26
40 KILOMETRES
1	2338	Naoko Takahashi	Japan	2:15:19

== Final ranking ==
Rank	Athlete	Country	Time	Note
1st place, gold medalist(s)	Naoko Takahashi	Japan	2:23:14	OR
2nd place, silver medalist(s)	Lidia Șimon	Romania	2:23:22	
3rd place, bronze medalist(s)	Joyce Chepchumba	Kenya	2:24:45	SB
4	Esther Wanjiru	Kenya	2:26:17	
5	Madina Biktagirova	Russia	2:26:33	SB
6	Elfenesh Alemu	Ethiopia	2:26:54	
7	Eri Yamaguchi	Japan	2:27:03	SB
8	Ham Bong-Sil	North Korea	2:27:07	PB
9	Fatuma Roba	Ethiopia	2:27:38	
10	Ren Xiujuan	China	2:27:55	
11	Kerryn McCann	Australia	2:28:37	
12	Maura Viceconte	Italy	2:29:26	
13	Tegla Loroupe	Kenya	2:29:45	
14	Irina Bogachova	Kyrgyzstan	2:29:55	
15	Ari Ichihashi	Japan	2:30:34	
16	Adriana Fernández	Mexico	2:30:51	
17	Judit Földing-Nagy	Hungary	2:30:54	SB
18	Ornella Ferrara	Italy	2:31:32	
19	Christine Clark	United States	2:31:35	PB
20	Jong Yong-Ok	North Korea	2:31:40	PB
21	Manuela Machado	Portugal	2:32:29	
22	Nadezhda Wijenberg	Netherlands	2:32:29	SB
23	Lyubov Morgunova	Russia	2:32:35	
24	Sonja Oberem	Germany	2:33:45	
25	Martha Tenorio	Ecuador	2:33:54	
26	Marian Sutton	Great Britain	2:34:33	
27	Érika Olivera	Chile	2:35:07	SB
28	Kim Chang-ok	North Korea	2:35:32	SB
29	Alina Gherasim	Romania	2:36:16	
30	Ana Isabel Alonso	Spain	2:36:45	
31	Colleen De Reuck	South Africa	2:36:48	
32	María Portillo Cruz	Peru	2:36:50	
33	Griselda González	Spain	2:38:28	
34	Oh Mi-Ja	South Korea	2:38:42	
35	Susan Hobson	Australia	2:38:44	
36	Gadissie Edato	Ethiopia	2:42:29	
37	Serap Aktaş	Turkey	2:42:40	
38	Daria Nauer	Switzerland	2:43:00	
39	María Luisa Muñoz	Spain	2:45:40	
40	Iglandini González	Colombia	2:47:26	
41	Gulsara Dadabayeva	Tajikistan	2:51:03	NR
42	Gina Coello	Honduras	3:02:32	
43	Aguida Amaral	Individual Olympic Athletes	3:10:55	
44	Rhonda Davidson-Alley	Guam	3:13:58	
45	Sirivanh Ketavong	Laos	3:34:27	
DID NOT FINISH (DNF)
	Martha Ernstdóttir	Iceland	DNF	
	Valentina Enachi	Moldova	DNF	
	Marleen Renders	Belgium	DNF	
	Elizabeth Mongudhi	Namibia	DNF	
	Garifa Kuku	Kazakhstan	DNF	
	Nicole Carroll	Australia	DNF	
	Valentina Yegorova	Russia	DNF	
	Anuța Cătună	Romania	DNF	
DID NOT START (DNS)
	Claudia Dreher	Germany	DNS	
