= Ahmed Soliman =

Ahmed Soliman may refer to:

- Ahmed Soliman (basketball), Egyptian basketball player
- Ahmed Soliman (footballer), Egyptian footballer
- Ahmed Abdel Mougod Soliman, Egyptian long-distance runner
