= Ágnes Sipka =

Hungarian long-distance runner (born 1954)

Ágnes Sipka (born August 14, 1954) is a retired long-distance runner from Hungary, who won the 1984 edition of the Berlin Marathon on September 30, 1984, clocking 2:39:32. She broke the Hungarian national record in the Budapest Marathon in 1986 and held it for a decade until Judit Földing-Nagy set the (current) Hungarian standard, lowering Sipka's time by two seconds in the Berlin Marathon in 1996.

== Achievements ==
Year	Competition	Venue	Position	Event	Notes
Representing Hungary
1983	Budapest Marathon	Budapest, Hungary	1st	Marathon	2:44:33
1984	Berlin Marathon	Berlin, West Germany	1st	Marathon	2:39:32
1985	New York City Marathon	New York City, US	10th	Marathon	2:40:22
1986	European Championships	Stuttgart, West Germany	20th	Marathon	2:45:36
1986	Budapest Marathon	Budapest, Hungary	1st	Marathon	2:28:51
