= Monaco Marathon =

- Date: March
- Location: Monaco to Ventimiglia (Italy) through Menton (France) and back
- Event type: Road
- Distance: Marathon–23.8km–10km
- Established: 1997
- Website: Official website

The Monaco Marathon or the Monaco and the Riviera Marathon (French: Marathon de Monaco et des Riviera) is a marathon run every year starting and finishing in Monaco. It crosses the border to France and Italy and goes along the coast to a turning point in Ventimiglia, Italy and back again to Monaco. There is also a 10 km race run entirely inside Monaco.

The marathon is run in March every year. In 2009 there were around 700 marathon participants, plus around 1000 participants in the 10 km race.

Due to the race's coincidence with French regional elections in 2010, the event was shortened to a half marathon, and Dennis Mehlfeld of Germany and American runner Heidi Freitag won the men's and women's races, respectively. The 10 km race continued as originally planned and a total of 1800 runners from 39 countries took part in the day's events that year.

From 2011 the race has been rebranded the Monaco Run with a course distance of 23.8km, slightly longer than a Half marathon.

== Past winners ==
Key: Course record 5km (2021–), 10km run (2017–2020,)

Edition	Year	Men's Winner	Time (h:m:s)	Women's Winner	Time (h:m:s)
—	2024	Yann Schrub (FRA)	13:22	Likina Amebaw (ETH)	14:35
—	2023	Jimmy Gressier (FRA)	13:12	Mirriam Chebet (KEN)	15:40
—	2021	Joshua Cheptegei (UGA)	13:13	Beatrice Chepkoech (KEN)	14:43
—	2020	Dmitrii Korneev (RUS)	37:47	Miriam Bazzicalupo (ITA)	43:48
—	2019	Adrien Janin (FRA)	39:56	Imane Zouhir (ITA)	46:19
—	2018	Karim Tahri (FRA)	31:14	Mathilde Gautier (FRA)	37:04
—	2017	Youssef Jaadi (FRA)	30:40	Hanan Farhoun (FRA)	36:07
18th	2016	Eliud Kimutai (KEN)	1:22:02	Ornella Ferrara (ITA)	1:31:36
17th	2015	Jean Claude Niyonizigiye (BDI)	1:15:40	Ornella Ferrara (ITA)	1:32:03
16th	2014	Eliud Kimutai (KEN)	1:15:02	Ornella Ferrara (ITA)	1:31:36
15th	2013	Nathan Chebet (UGA)	1:13:48	Alexandra Louison (FRA)	1:30:06
14th	2012	Jean Claude Niyonizigiye (BDI)	1:14:59	Ornella Ferrara (ITA)	1:29:17
14th	2011	Tarik Marhnaoui (MAR)	1:18:52	Ornella Ferrara (ITA)	1:30:39
13th	2010	Dennis Mehlfeld (GER)	1:08:56	Heidi Freitag (USA)	1:25:32
12th	2009	Ben Kimwole (KEN)	2:11:01	Bekele Belaynesh (ETH)	2:48:49
11th	2008	Geoffrey Mutai (KEN)	2:12:40	Yelena Kozhevnikova (RUS)	2:41:21
Race not held in 2007
10th	2006	Wilfried Cheserek (KEN)	2:17:21	Lena Gavelin (SWE)	2:39:29
9th	2005	John Kirui (KEN)	2:19:08	Alina Tecuta (ROM)	2:43:44
8th	2004	Andrey Chernichov (RUS)	2:22:12	Mariya Fedoseyeva (RUS)	2:41:17
7th	2003	Francis Kemboi (KEN)	2:20:08	Yelena Kaledina (RUS)	2:44:39
6th	2002	Tadesse Hailemarian (ETH)	2:14:08	Mariya Fedoseyeva (RUS)	2:37:24
5th	2001	Wilson Kibet (KEN)	2:13:53	Judit Földing-Nagy (HUN)	2:38:24
4th	2000	Philip Tanui (KEN)	2:18:35	Jacqueline Jerotich (KEN)	2:34:04
3rd	1999	Kenneth Cheruiyot (KEN)	2:11:26	Alla Zhilyayeva (RUS)	2:34:47
2nd	1998	Ezequiel Bitok (KEN)	2:11:48	Jane Salumäe (EST)	2:32:55
1st	1997	Ezequiel Bitok (KEN)	2:12:30	Maura Viceconte (ITA)	2:28:16

- From 2010, the official race distance is 23,8 km.
