= 2000 United States Olympic trials (track and field) =

- Dates: July 14–23
- Host city: Sacramento, California, United States
- Venue: Hornet Stadium
- Level: Senior
- Type: Outdoor
- Events: 40 (men: 20; women: 20)

The 2000 United States Olympic trials for track and field were held at Hornet Stadium in Sacramento, California. Organised by USA Track and Field, the ten-day competition lasted from July 14 until July 23 and served as the national championships in track and field for the United States. The men's Marathon trials were held May 7 in Pittsburgh, Pennsylvania.

The results of the event determined qualification for the American Olympic team at the 2000 Summer Olympics, held in Sydney. Provided they had achieved the Olympic "A" standard, the top three athletes gained a place on the Olympic team. In the event that a leading athlete did not hold an "A" standard, or an athlete withdrew, the next highest finishing athlete with an "A" standard was selected instead.

Maurice Greene, who won the 100 meter trial, and Michael Johnson, who won the 400 meter trial and was the defending 200 meter gold medallist, both pulled hamstrings in the 200 meter final. Neither qualified in that event.

== Medal summary ==
Key: ≠ Athlete without "A" standard, not selected.

=== Men ===
==== Men track events ====
Event	Gold		Silver		Bronze	
100 meters Wind : -1.7 m/s	Maurice Greene	10.01	Curtis Johnson	10.07	Jon Drummond	10.07
200 meters Wind : -0.3 m/s	John Capel	19.85	Floyd Heard	19.89	Coby Miller	19.96
400 meters	Michael Johnson	43.68	Alvin Harrison	44.63	Antonio Pettigrew	44.66
800 meters	Mark Everett	1:45.67	Rich Kenah	1:46.05	Bryan Woodward	1:46.09
1500 meters	Gabe Jennings	3:35.90	Jason Pyrah	3:36.70	Michael Stember	3:37.04
5000 meters	Adam Goucher	13:27.06	Brad Hauser	13:27.31	Nick Rogers	13:29.48
10,000 meters^{[a]}	Mebrahtom Keflezighi	28:03.32	Alan Culpepper	28:03.35	Abdihakem Abdirahman	28:19.08
Marathon	Rod DeHaven	2:15:30	Peter DeLaCerda ≠	2:16:18	Mark Coogan ≠	2:17:04
110 meters hurdles Wind : +3.2 m/s	Allen Johnson	12.97	Mark Crear	13.11	Terrence Trammell	13.19
400 meters hurdles	Angelo Taylor	47.62	Eric Thomas	48.22	James Carter	48.46
3000 meters steeplechase	Pascal Dobert	8:15.77CR	Mark Croghan	8:16.20	Tony Cosey	8:21.41
20 km walk	Tim Seaman	1:25:41	Kevin Eastler	1:26:38	Andrew Hermann	1:28:06

==== Men field events ====
Event	Gold		Silver		Bronze	
High jump	Charles Austin	2.32 m (7 ft 7 1/4 in)	Kenny Evans	2.27 m (7 ft 5 1/4 in)	Nathan Leeper	2.27 m (7 ft 5 1/4 in)
Pole vault	Lawrence Johnson	5.83 m (19 ft 1 1/2 in)	Nick Hysong	5.73 m (18 ft 9 1/2 in)	Chad Harting * jump off winner Derek Miles; Pat Manson	5.62 m (18 ft 5 1/4 in) r5.62 m (18 ft 5 1/4 in); 5.62 m (18 ft 5 1/4 in); 5.62 m (18 ft 5 1/4 in)
Long jump	Melvin Lister	8.32 m (27 ft 3 1/2 in)	Dwight Phillips	8.14 m (26 ft 8 1/4 in)	Walter Davis	8.11 m (26 ft 7 1/4 in)
Triple jump	Robert Howard	16.99 m (55 ft 8 3/4 in)	LaMark Carter	16.96 m (55 ft 7 1/2 in)	Walter Davis	16.84 m (55 ft 2 3/4 in)
Shot put	Adam Nelson	22.12 m (72 ft 6 3/4 in) CR	C. J. Hunter	21.87 m (71 ft 9 in)	Andy Bloom	21.61 m (70 ft 10 3/4 in)
Discus throw	Adam Setliff	63.93 m (209 ft 8 in)	John Godina	63.60 m (208 ft 7 in)	Anthony Washington	63.35 m (207 ft 10 in)
Hammer throw	Lance Deal	78.87 m (258 ft 9 in)	Kevin McMahon	73.30 m (240 ft 5 in)	Jud Logan	70.99 m (232 ft 10 in)
Javelin throw	Breaux Greer	81.07 m (265 ft 11 in)	Tom Pukstys ≠	79.35 m (260 ft 4 in)	Todd Riech ≠	76.93 m (252 ft 4 in)
Decathlon	Tom Pappas	8467	Chris Huffins	8285	Kip Janvrin	8057

==== Notes ====
^{a}

=== Women ===
==== Women track events ====
Event	Gold		Silver		Bronze	
100 meters Wind : -1.0 m/s	Marion Jones	10.88	Inger Miller	11.05	Chryste Gaines	11.13
200 meters Wind : +0.5 m/s	Marion Jones	22.62	Nanceen Perry	22.84	Carlette Guidry	23.12
400 meters	LaTasha Colander-Richardson	49.87	Jearl Miles Clark	50.23	Michelle Collins	50.29
800 meters	Hazel Clark	1:58.97	Jearl Miles Clark	1:59.12	Joetta Clark Diggs	1:59.49
1500 meters	Regina Jacobs	4:01.01 CR	Suzy Favor Hamilton	4:01.81	Marla Runyan	4:06.44
5000 meters	Regina Jacobs	14:45.35 NR	Deena Kastor	15:11.55	Elva Dryer	15:12.07
10,000 meters^{[b]}	Deena Kastor	31:09.65 CR	Elva Dryer	31:58.14	Kate O'Neill	32:07.25
Marathon	Chris Clark	2:33:31	Kristy Johnston	2:35:36	Anne Marie Lauck	2:36:05
100 meters hurdles Wind : -0.3 m/s	Gail Devers	12.33 NR	Melissa Morrison	12.63	Sharon Jewell	12.69
400 meters hurdles	Sandra Glover	53.33	Kim Batten	54.70	Tonja Buford-Bailey	54.80
3000 meters steeplechase^{[c]}	Elizabeth Jackson	9:57.20 NR	Lisa Nye	10:00.63	Kara Ormond	10:03.09
20 km walk	Michelle Rohl	1:32:39.00 CR	Yueling Chen	1:33:40.00	Debbi Lawrence	1:33:48.00

==== Women field events ====
Event	Gold		Silver		Bronze	
High jump	Karol Rovelto	1.93 m (6 ft 3 3/4 in)	Erin Aldrich	1.93 m (6 ft 3 3/4 in)	Amy Acuff; *Jump off winner Tisha Waller	1.90 m (6 ft 2 3/4 in); 1.91 m (6 ft 3 in); 1.90 m (6 ft 2 3/4 in)
Pole vault	Stacy Dragila	4.63 m (15 ft 2 1/4 in) WR	Kellie Suttle	4.43 m (14 ft 6 1/4 in)	Mel Mueller	4.33 m (14 ft 2 1/4 in)
Long jump^{[d]}	Marion Jones	7.02 m (23 ft 1/4 in)	Dawn Burrell	6.97 m (22 ft 10 1/4 in)w	Shana Williams	6.87 m (22 ft 6 1/4 in)w
Triple jump^{[e]}	Nicole Gamble	13.96 m (45 ft 9 1/2 in)	Sheila Hudson ≠	13.93 m (45 ft 8 1/4 in)	Tiombé Hurd ≠	13.91 m (45 ft 7 1/2 in)
Shot put	Connie Price-Smith	18.63 m (61 ft 1 1/4 in)	Jesseca Cross	17.74 m (58 ft 2 1/4 in)	Dawn Dumble	17.40 m (57 ft 1 in)
Discus throw	Seilala Sua	65.90 m (216 ft 2 in) CR	Suzy Powell	64.58 m (211 ft 10 in)	Kris Kuehl	61.74 m (202 ft 6 in)
Hammer throw^{[f]}	Dawn Ellerbe	69.20 m (227 ft 0 in) CR	Amy Palmer	66.31 m (217 ft 6 in)	Jesseca Cross	66.20 m (217 ft 2 in)
Javelin throw	Lynda Blutreich	58.28 m (191 ft 2 in) CR	Kim Kreiner	57.06 m (187 ft 2 in)	Emily Carlsten	56.98 m (186 ft 11 in)
Heptathlon	DeDee Nathan	6343	Shelia Burrell	6339	Kelly Blair LaBounty	6180
