= Tünde Szabó (athlete) =

Hungarian long-distance runner

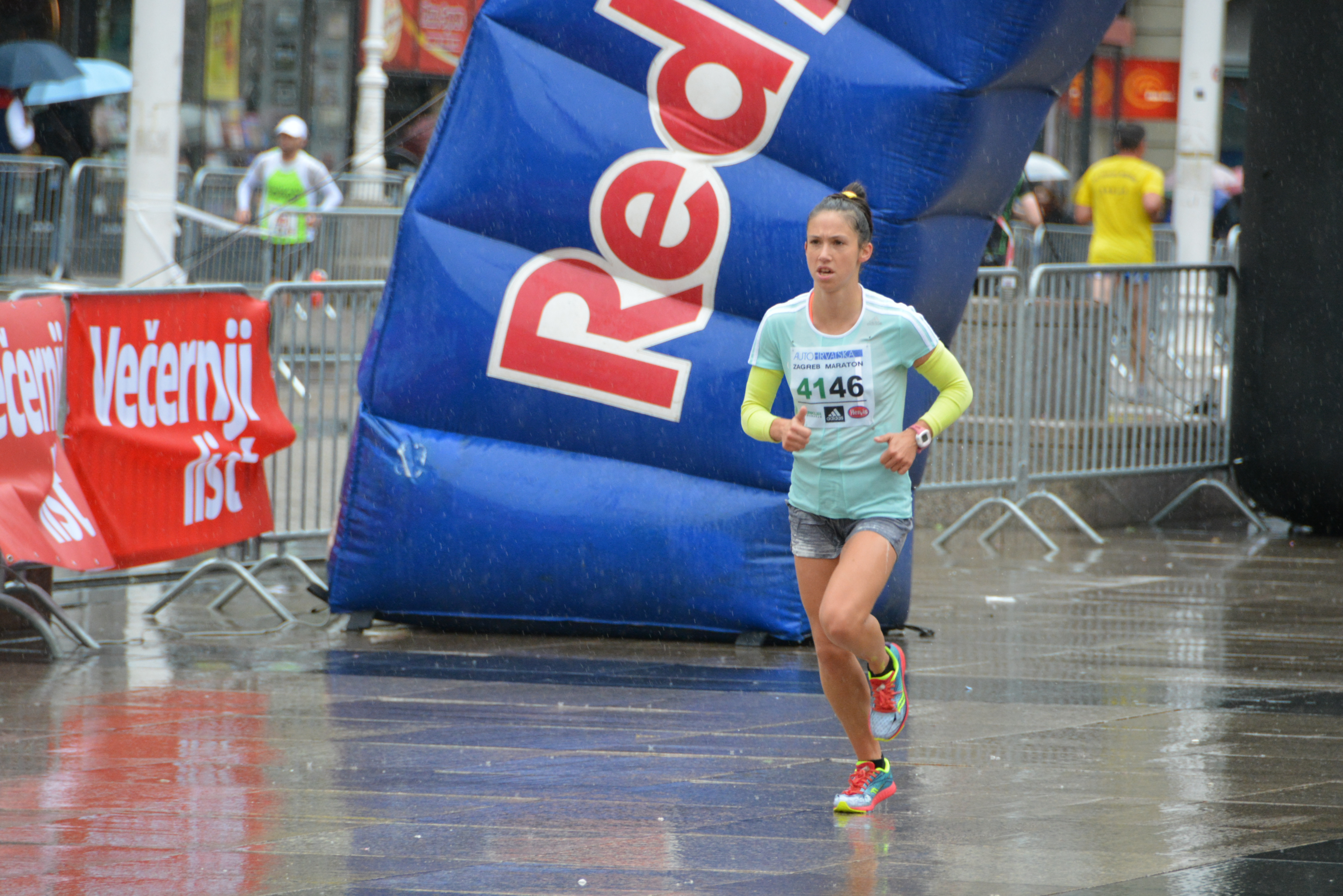
- Szabó in 2015

Personal information
- Born: 8 February 1989 (age 37)
- Height: 154 cm (5 ft 1 in)
- Weight: 46 kg (101 lb)

Sport
- Sport: Track and field
- Event: Marathon
- Club: Pécsi VSK
- Coached by: Balázs Freier

Achievements and titles
- Personal best: 2:41:09 (2015)

Tünde Szabó (born 8 February 1989) is a Hungarian long-distance runner. She placed 83rd in the marathon at the 2016 Olympics. She won the Budapest Marathon three times, in 2017, 2018 and 2020.
