= Patrick Ndayisenga =

Burundian runner

Patrick Ndayisenga (born 28 October 1971) is a Burundian athlete who specialized in the marathon and long-distance running

Ndayisenga competed at the 2000 Summer Olympics in Sydney when he entered the marathon, but he didn't finish the race. He twice competed at the IAAF World Cross Country Championships with his best finish being 19th at the 1998 IAAF World Cross Country Championships.
