= Athletics at the 2000 Summer Olympics – Men's marathon =

Men's marathon at the Games of the XXVII Olympiad
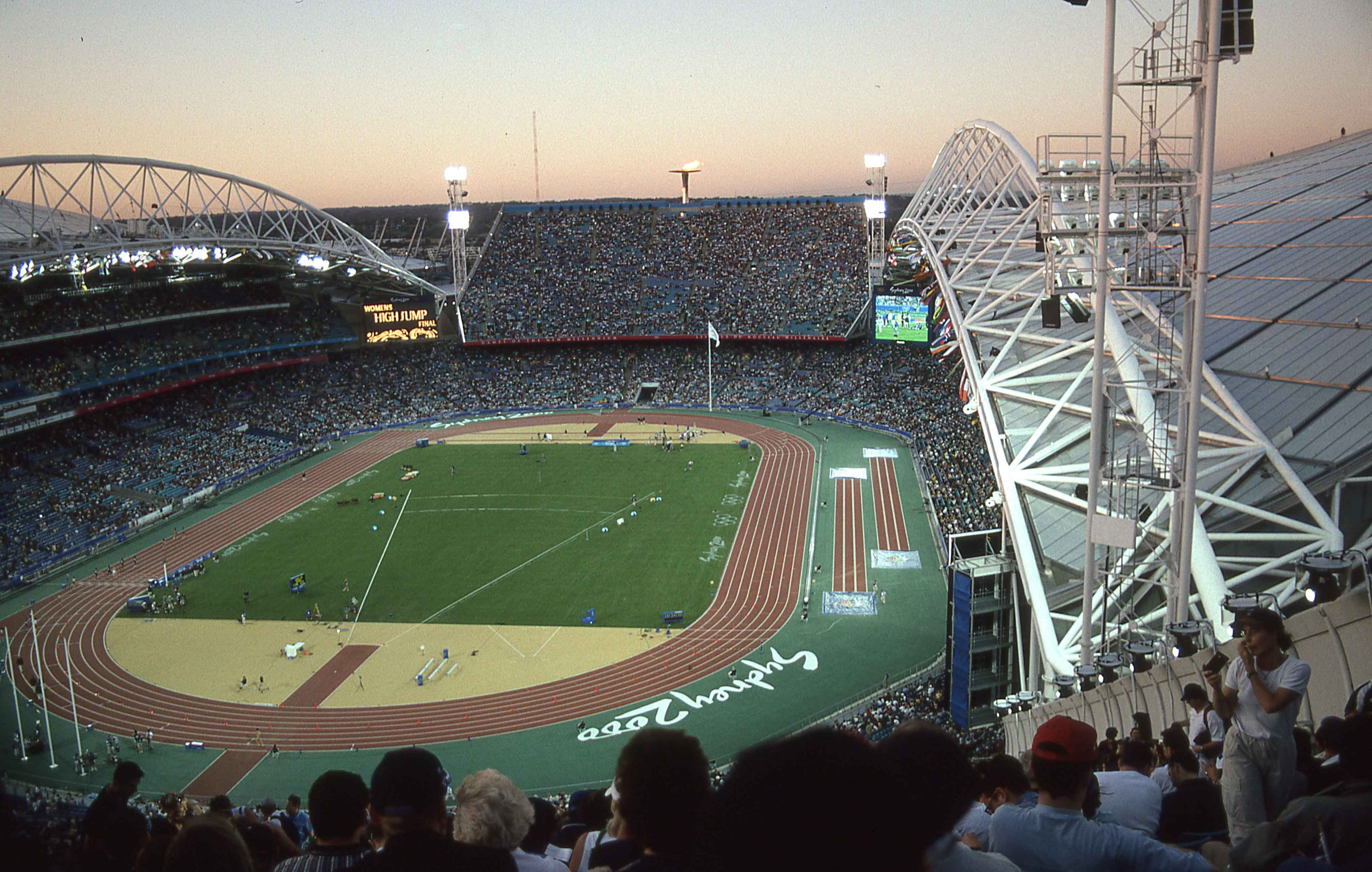
- Olympic Stadium
- Venue: Stadium Australia, Sydney
- Date: 1 October
- Competitors: 100 from 65 nations
- Winning time: 2:10:11

Medalists
1st place, gold medalist(s)		Gezahegne Abera; Ethiopia
2nd place, silver medalist(s)		Erick Wainaina; Kenya
3rd place, bronze medalist(s)		Tesfaye Tola; Ethiopia

The men's marathon event at the 2000 Summer Olympics took place on 1 October 2000 in Sydney, Australia. One hundred athletes from 65 nations competed. The maximum number of athletes per nation had been set at 3 since the 1930 Olympic Congress. The event was won by Gezahegne Abera of Ethiopia, the nation's first victory in the event since winning three in a row from 1960 to 1968. Ethiopia's fourth gold medal in the men's marathon moved it out of a tie with France and the United States into sole possession of the most men's marathon gold medals. Ethiopia also became the first nation to have two medalists in the men's marathon in the same Games since South Africa did it in 1912, as Tesfaye Tola took bronze. Kenya won its third men's marathon medal in four Games with Erick Wainaina's silver. This made Wainaina the sixth man to earn two medals in the event, after his bronze in 1996.

== Background ==
This was the 24th appearance of the event, which is one of 12 athletics events to have been held at every Summer Olympics. Returning runners from the 1996 marathon included all three medalists (gold medalist Josia Thugwane of South Africa, silver medalist Lee Bong-Ju of South Korea, and bronze medalist Erick Wainaina of Kenya) along with fourth-place finisher Martín Fiz of Spain, seventh-place finisher Steve Moneghetti of Australia, and eighth-place finisher Benjamín Paredes of Mexico. The Kenyan and Ethiopian teams were considered strong, but without any individual favorite. Khalid Khannouchi of Morocco had set the world record in 1999, but earlier in 2000 had changed citizenship to the United States. Abel Antón of Spain had won the last two world championships; he did compete in Sydney.

The Democratic Republic of the Congo, the Federated States of Micronesia, Slovakia, and Tajikistan each made their first appearance in Olympic men's marathons; there was also one Independent Olympic Athlete from East Timor. The United States made its 23rd appearance, most of any nation, having missed only the boycotted 1980 Games.

== Qualification ==
Each National Olympic Committee was permitted to enter up to three athletes that had run 2:14:00 or faster during the qualification period. The maximum number of athletes per nation had been set at 3 since the 1930 Olympic Congress. If an NOC had no athletes that qualified under that standard, one athlete that had run 2:20:00 or faster could be entered.

== Competition format and course ==
As all Olympic marathons, the competition was a single race. The marathon distance of 42,195 km was run over a point-to-point route starting at the North Sydney Oval and finishing at the Olympic Stadium.

== Records ==
These were the standing world and Olympic records prior to the 2000 Summer Olympics.

World record	Khalid Khannouchi (MAR)	2:05:42	Chicago, United States	24 October 1999
Olympic record	Carlos Lopes (POR)	2:09:21	Los Angeles, United States	12 August 1984

No new world or Olympic bests were set during the competition. The following national records were established during the competition:

Nation	Athlete	Round	Time
Angola	João N'Tyamba	Final	2:16:43

== Schedule ==
All times are Australian Eastern Standard Time (UTC+10)

Date	Time	Round
Sunday, 1 October 2000	16:00	Final

== Results ==
Rank	Athlete	Nation	Time	Notes
1st place, gold medalist(s)	Gezahegne Abera	Ethiopia	2:10:11	
2nd place, silver medalist(s)	Erick Wainaina	Kenya	2:10:31	
3rd place, bronze medalist(s)	Tesfaye Tola	Ethiopia	2:11:10	SB
4	Jon Brown	Great Britain	2:11:17	
5	Giacomo Leone	Italy	2:12:14	SB
6	Martín Fiz	Spain	2:13:06	
7	Abdelkader El Mouaziz	Morocco	2:13:49	
8	Mohamed Ouaadi	France	2:14:04	
9	Tendai Chimusasa	Zimbabwe	2:14:19	
10	Steve Moneghetti	Australia	2:14:50	
11	António Pinto	Portugal	2:15:17	
12	Hendrick Ramaala	South Africa	2:16:19	
13	Kamiel Maase	Netherlands	2:16:24	
14	Silvio Guerra	Ecuador	2:16:27	
15	Mathias Ntawulikura	Rwanda	2:16:39	
16	Thabiso Moqhali	Lesotho	2:16:43	
17	João N'Tyamba	Angola	2:16:43	NR
18	Domingos Castro	Portugal	2:16:52	
19	Keith Cullen	Great Britain	2:16:59	
20	Josia Thugwane	South Africa	2:16:59	
21	Shinji Kawashima	Japan	2:17:21	
22	Simretu Alemayehu	Ethiopia	2:17:21	
23	Kamel Kohil	Algeria	2:17:46	
24	Lee Bong-Ju	South Korea	2:17:57	
25	Greg van Hest	Netherlands	2:18:00	
26	Pavel Kokin	Russia	2:18:02	
27	Andrés Espinosa	Mexico	2:18:02	
28	Roderic De Highden	Australia	2:18:04	
29	Kim Jung-Won	North Korea	2:18:04	
30	Kim Jong-chol	North Korea	2:18:04	
31	Pamenos Ballantyne	Saint Vincent and the Grenadines	2:19:08	
32	Ronnie Holassie	Trinidad and Tobago	2:19:24	
33	Michael Buchleitner	Austria	2:19:26	
34	Dmitriy Kapitonov	Russia	2:19:38	
35	Pavel Loskutov	Estonia	2:19:41	
36	Viktor Röthlin	Switzerland	2:20:06	
37	Michael Fietz	Germany	2:20:09	
38	Tahar Mansouri	Tunisia	2:20:33	SB
39	José Luis Molina	Costa Rica	2:20:37	
40	Carlos Tarazona	Venezuela	2:20:39	
41	Nobuyuki Sato	Japan	2:20:52	SB
42	Alberto Juzdado	Spain	2:21:18	
43	Johannes Maremane	South Africa	2:21:25	
44	Bruce Deacon	Canada	2:21:38	
45	Jeong Nam-gyun	South Korea	2:22:23	
46	Néstor García	Uruguay	2:22:30	
47	Ahmed Abdel Mougod Soliman	Egypt	2:22:47	
48	Luketz Swartbooi	Namibia	2:22:55	
49	Antoni Bernadó	Andorra	2:23:03	
50	Luís Novo	Portugal	2:23:04	
51	Lucky Bhembe	Swaziland	2:23:08	PB
52	Boubker El-Afoui	Morocco	2:23:53	
53	Abel Antón	Spain	2:24:04	
54	Carsten Eich	Germany	2:24:11	
55	Valeriu Vlas	Moldova	2:24:35	
56	Mark Steinle	Great Britain	2:24:42	
57	Alex Malinga	Uganda	2:24:53	
58	Oscar Cortínez	Argentina	2:25:01	
59	Kil Jae-son	North Korea	2:25:13	
60	Petko Stefanov	Bulgaria	2:26:24	
61	Zebedayo Bayo	Tanzania	2:26:24	
62	Roman Kejžar	Slovenia	2:26:38	
63	Panagiotis Kharamis	Greece	2:26:55	
64	Benjamín Paredes	Mexico	2:27:17	
65	Baek Seung-do	South Korea	2:28:25	
66	Lee Troop	Australia	2:29:32	
67	António Zeferino	Cape Verde	2:29:46	
68	Sergey Zabavski	Tajikistan	2:30:29	
69	Rod DeHaven	United States	2:30:46	
70	Nazirdin Akylbekov	Kyrgyzstan	2:31:26	
71	Calisto da Costa	Individual Olympic Athletes	2:33:11	
72	Marco Condori	Bolivia	2:34:11	
73	Sarath Prasanna Gamage	Sri Lanka	2:34:39	
74	Gian Luigi Macina	San Marino	2:35:42	
75	Vanderlei Lima	Brazil	2:37:08	
76	Željko Petrović	Bosnia and Herzegovina	2:38:29	
77	Tiyapo Maso	Botswana	2:38:53	
78	Ðuro Kodžo	Bosnia and Herzegovina	2:39:14	
79	José Alejandro Semprún	Venezuela	3:00:02	
80	To Rithya	Cambodia	3:03:56	
81	Elias Rodriguez	Federated States of Micronesia	3:09:14	
—	Takayuki Inubushi	Japan	DNF	
—	Kenneth Cheruiyot	Kenya	DNF	
—	Willy Kalombo Mwenze	Democratic Republic of the Congo	DNF	
—	Abdellah Béhar	France	DNF	
—	Stefano Baldini	Italy	DNF	
—	Elijah Lagat	Kenya	DNF	
—	Piotr Gładki	Poland	DNF	
—	Patrick Ndayisenga	Burundi	DNF	
—	José Alirio Carrasco	Colombia	DNF	
—	Angelo Simon	Tanzania	DNF	
—	Róbert Štefko	Slovakia	DNF	
—	Osmiro Silva	Brazil	DNF	
—	Rashid Jamal	Qatar	DNF	
—	Adel Edeli	Libya	DNF	
—	Éder Fialho	Brazil	DNF	
—	Vincenzo Modica	Italy	DNF	
—	Daher Gadid Omar	Djibouti	DNF	
—	Richard Rodriguez	Aruba	DNF	
—	Fokasi Wilbrod	Tanzania	DNF	
