= Fokasi Wilbrod =

Tanzanian long-distance runner

Personal information
- Nationality: Tanzanian
- Born: 4 May 1970 (age 56)

Sport
- Sport: Long-distance running
- Event: Marathon

Fokasi Wilbrod Fullah (born 4 May 1970) is a Tanzanian long-distance runner. He competed in the men's marathon at the 2000 Summer Olympics.
