= Gadissie Edato =

Ethiopian long-distance runner

Personal information
- Nationality: Ethiopian
- Born: 15 March 1973 (age 53)

Sport
- Sport: Long-distance running
- Event: Marathon

Gadissie Edato (born 15 March 1973) is an Ethiopian long-distance runner. She competed in the women's marathon at the 2000 Summer Olympics.
