= Kil Jae-son =

North Korean runner (born 1975)

Personal information
- Native name: 길재선
- Nationality: North Korean
- Born: 5 May 1975 (age 51)

Sport
- Sport: Long-distance running
- Event: Marathon

Kil Jae-son (born 5 May 1975) is a North Korean long-distance runner. He competed in the men's marathon at the 2000 Summer Olympics.
