= Sarath Prasanna Gamage =

Sri Lankan long-distance runner

Personal information
- Nationality: Sri Lankan
- Born: 27 January 1972 (age 54)

Sport
- Sport: Long-distance running
- Event: Marathon

Sarath Prasanna Gamage (born 27 January 1972) is a Sri Lankan long-distance runner. He competed in the men's marathon at the 2000 Summer Olympics.
