= María Portillo =

Peruvian marathon runner

María Portilla
Personal information
- Full name: María Portilla Cruz
- Nationality: Peru
- Born: 10 April 1972 (age 54) Apurímac, Peru
- Height: 1.62 m (5 ft 4 in)
- Weight: 50 kg (110 lb)

Sport
- Sport: Athletics
- Event: Marathon

Achievements and titles
- Personal bests: Half-marathon: 1:15:02 (2001); Marathon: 2:35:19 (2008)

María Portilla Cruz (born April 10, 1972, in Apurímac) is a Peruvian marathon runner. Portillo made her official debut for the 2000 Summer Olympics in Sydney, where she placed thirty-second out of fifty-four runners in the women's marathon, with a time of 2:36:50.

Eight years after competing in her last Olympics, Portillo qualified for the second time, as a 36-year-old, in the women's marathon at the 2008 Summer Olympics in Beijing. She finished the race in thirty-ninth place by two seconds behind Germany's Melanie Kraus, with a national record and a personal best time of 2:35:19.
