= Angelo Simon =

Tanzanian long-distance runner

Personal information
- Nationality: Tanzanian
- Born: 6 December 1974 (age 51)

Sport
- Sport: Long-distance running
- Event: Marathon

Angelo Peter Simon (born 6 December 1974) is a Tanzanian long-distance runner. He competed in the men's marathon at the 2000 Summer Olympics. He ran a time of 2:16:58 at the 1996 Boston Marathon, and the next year he won the Greater Hartford Marathon in Connecticut in 2:16:59.
