= Nickey Carroll =

Australian long-distance runner

Nicole ("Nickey") Carroll (born 14 January 1972) is a former Australian long-distance runner who competed in the marathon at the 2000 Summer Olympics. In 1999, Carroll set a course record of 2:29:21 while winning the California International Marathon. Her P.R. over the distance is 2:25:52 set in the 1999 London Marathon where Carroll finished in fourth place.

== Achievements ==
Year	Competition	Venue	Position	Notes
Representing Australia
1995	Canberra Marathon	Canberra, Australia	3rd	2:47:00
1998	Paris Marathon	Paris, France	1st	2:27:06
1999	California International Marathon	California State Capitol, United States	1st	2:29:21
