= Garifa Kuku =

Kazakhstani long-distance runner

Personal information
- Nationality: Kazakhstani
- Born: 30 November 1959 (age 66)

Sport
- Sport: Long-distance running
- Event: Marathon

Garifa Kuku (born 30 November 1959) is a Kazakhstani long-distance runner. She competed in the women's marathon at the 2000 Summer Olympics.
