= Boubker El-Afoui =

Moroccan long-distance runner

Personal information
- Nationality: Moroccan
- Born: 1 January 1969 (age 57)

Sport
- Sport: Long-distance running
- Event: Marathon

Boubker El-Afoui (born 1 January 1969) is a Moroccan long-distance runner. He competed in the men's marathon at the 2000 Summer Olympics.
