= Christine Clark =

American long-distance runner

Christine "Chris" Clark (born October 10, 1962, in Butte, Montana) is a retired female long-distance runner from the United States, who competed for her native country at the 2000 Summer Olympics in Sydney, Australia. There she ended up in 19th place in the women's marathon race. By virtue of winning the Olympic Trials, she was also the 2000 United States National Champion in the Marathon.

== Achievements ==
Year	Competition	Venue	Position	Event	Notes
Representing the United States
1995	Anchorage Mayor's Midnight Sun Marathon	Anchorage, Alaska	1st	Marathon	2:55:08
1995	Seattle Marathon	Seattle, Washington	1st	Marathon	2:49:21
1998	Anchorage Mayor's Midnight Sun Marathon	Anchorage, Alaska	1st	Marathon	2:48:16
1998	Portland Marathon	Portland, Oregon	2nd	Marathon	2:47:14
1999	Anchorage Mayor's Midnight Sun Marathon	Anchorage, Alaska	1st	Marathon	2:44:49
1999	Twin Cities Marathon	Minneapolis–St. Paul, Minnesota	3rd	Marathon	2:40:38
2000	US Olympic Trials	Columbia, South Carolina	1st	Marathon	2:33:31
2000	Olympic Games	Sydney, Australia	19th	Marathon	2:31:35
