= Rhonda Davidson-Alley =

Guamanian athlete

Personal information
- Nationality: Guam
- Born: April 19, 1961 (age 65)

Sport
- Sport: Long-distance running
- Event: Marathon

Rhonda Davidson-Alley (born April 19, 1961) is a Guam long-distance runner. She competed in the women's marathon at the 2000 Summer Olympics.
