= Beáta Rakonczai =

Hungarian long-distance runner

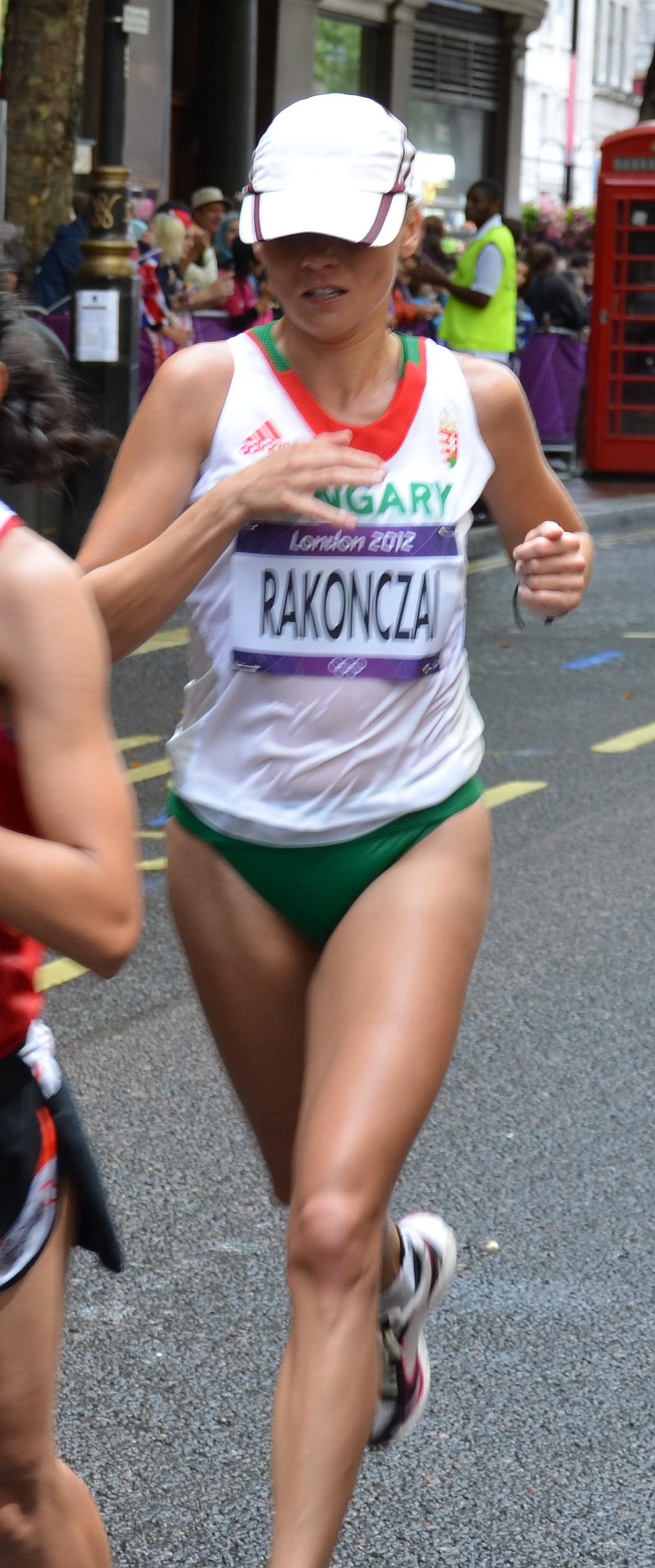
- Rakonczai in the 2012 Summer Olympics marathon

Personal information
- Born: June 25, 1977 (age 49)
- Height: 1.7 m (5 ft 7 in)
- Weight: 56 kg (123 lb)

Sport
- Country: Hungary
- Sport: Athletics
- Event: Marathon

Beáta Rakonczai (born 25 June 1977 in Nyíregyháza) is a Hungarian long-distance runner. She has competed in the Olympic marathon three times, coming 48th at the 2004 Olympics, not finishing in Beijing in 2008 and finishing 85th at the 2012 Summer Olympics with a time of 2:41:20.
