= Lágymányos =

Neighborhood in Budapest, Hungary

Coordinates: 47°28′N 19°03′E

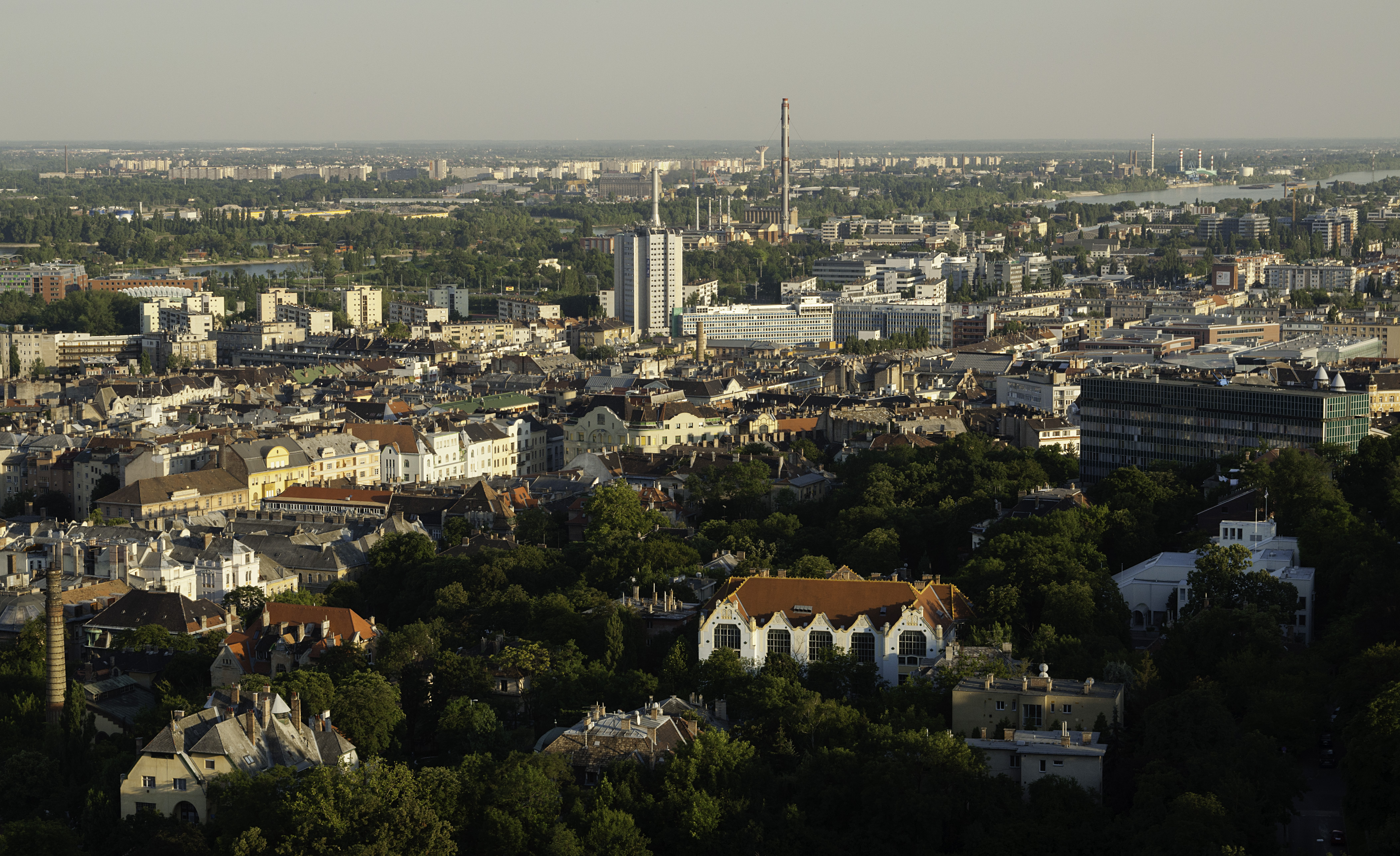
An overview of Lágymányos from Gellért Hill.

Lágymányos is a neighbourhood in the district of Újbuda in Budapest, Hungary. In 2001, Lágymányos had a population of 19,741. The Budapest University of Technology and Economics is located here, as well as some faculties of Eötvös Loránd University.

The neighbourhood is served by a number of tram and bus lines, including the 4 and 6 trams.
