= Eri Yamaguchi (runner) =

Japanese long-distance runner

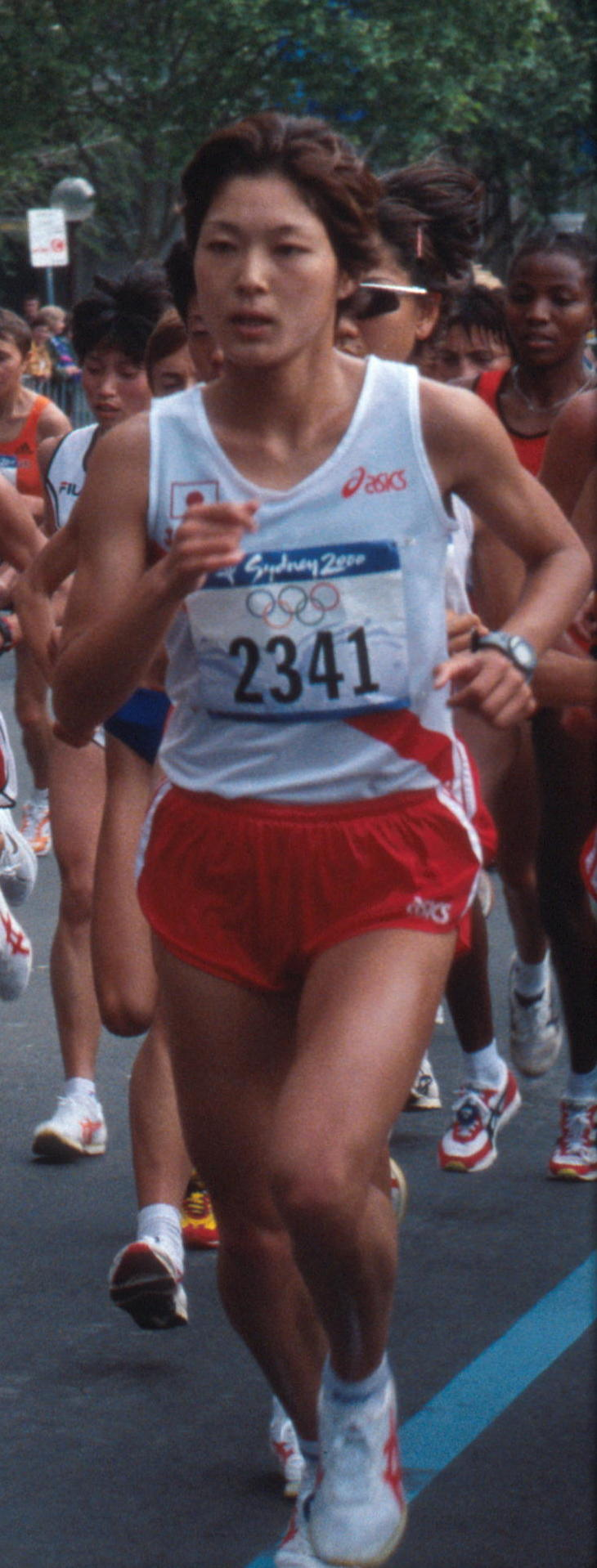
- Yamaguchi competing in the marathon, Sydney Olympics 2000

Personal information
- Born: January 14, 1973 (age 52) Takino, Hyōgo, Japan

Sport
- Sport: Marathon

Eri Yamaguchi (山口 衛里, Yamaguchi Eri; born 14 January 1973 in Takino, Hyogo) is a Japanese long-distance runner who specializes in the marathon race.

She won the 1999 Tokyo International Women's Marathon and finished seventh at the 2000 Summer Olympics. Her personal best time is 2:22:12 hours.

== Achievements ==
Year	Competition	Venue	Position	Event	Notes
Representing Japan
1998	Hokkaido Marathon	Sapporo, Japan	1st	Marathon	2:27:36
1999	Tokyo Marathon	Tokyo, Japan	1st	Marathon	2:22:12
2000	Olympic Games	Sydney, Australia	7th	Marathon	2:27:03
