= Ahmed Abdel Mougod Soliman =

Egyptian long-distance runner

Personal information
- Nationality: Egyptian
- Born: 19 December 1970 (age 55)

Sport
- Sport: Long-distance running
- Event: Marathon

Ahmed Abdel Mougod Soliman (born 19 December 1970) is an Egyptian long-distance runner. He competed in the men's marathon at the 2000 Summer Olympics.
