= Kenneth Cheruiyot =

Kenyan long-distance runner

Kenneth Cheruiyot (born August 2, 1974) is an athlete from Kenya who specialises in long-distance running. He is most famous for winning the Rotterdam Marathon in 2000. He finished second in the event in 2001 and 2002. In 2002 he fell to the ground and broke his arm after 10 kilometers of running, but still managed to finish and even grab silver.

== Biography ==
At the 1997 IAAF World Half Marathon Championships Cheruiyot was third, behind fellow Kenyans Shem Kororia and Moses Tanui. He represented Kenya at the 2000 Summer Olympics in Sydney, but failed to finish marathon race.

He won the Monaco Marathon in 1999, making a new race record by running 2:11:26.

He was married to Nancy Lagat, an Olympic gold medalist.

== Achievements ==
Year	Competition	Venue	Position	Event	Notes
Representing Kenya
1999	Monaco Marathon	Monte Carlo, Monaco	1st	Marathon	2:11:26
2000	Rotterdam Marathon	Rotterdam, Netherlands	1st	Marathon	2:08:22
2000	Olympic Games	Sydney, Australia	—	Marathon	DNF
2001	Rotterdam Marathon	Rotterdam, Netherlands	2nd	Marathon	2:07:18
2002	Rotterdam Marathon	Rotterdam, Netherlands	2nd	Marathon	2:09:43
