= María Luisa Muñoz =

Spanish long-distance runner

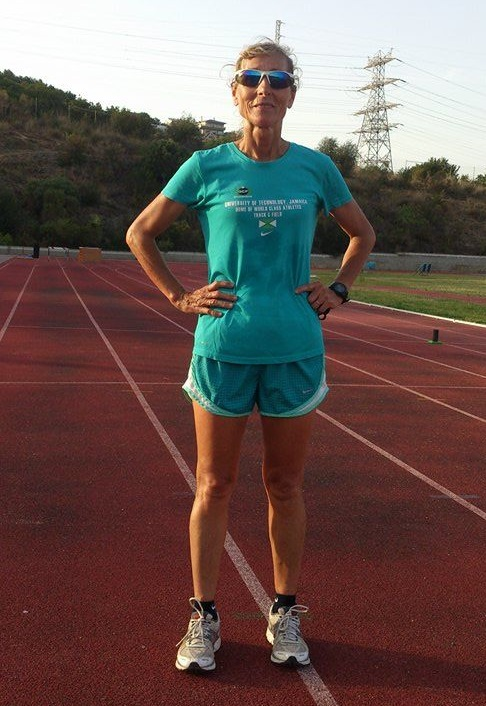

Personal information
- Nationality: Spanish
- Born: 6 May 1959 (age 67)

Sport
- Sport: Long-distance running
- Event: Marathon

María Luisa Muñoz (born 6 May 1959) is a Spanish long-distance runner. She competed in the women's marathon at the 2000 Summer Olympics.
