= Ida Kovács =

Hungarian long-distance runner

Personal information
- Nationality: Hungarian
- Born: 5 September 1975 (age 50)
- Height: 170 cm (5 ft 7 in)
- Weight: 56 kg (123 lb)

Sport
- Sport: Long-distance running
- Event: Marathon

Ida Kovács (born 5 September 1975) is a Hungarian long-distance runner. She competed in the women's marathon at the 2004 Summer Olympics. She won the Florence Marathon in 1998 and the Budapest Marathon in 2002.
