= Alina Gherasim =

Romanian long-distance runner

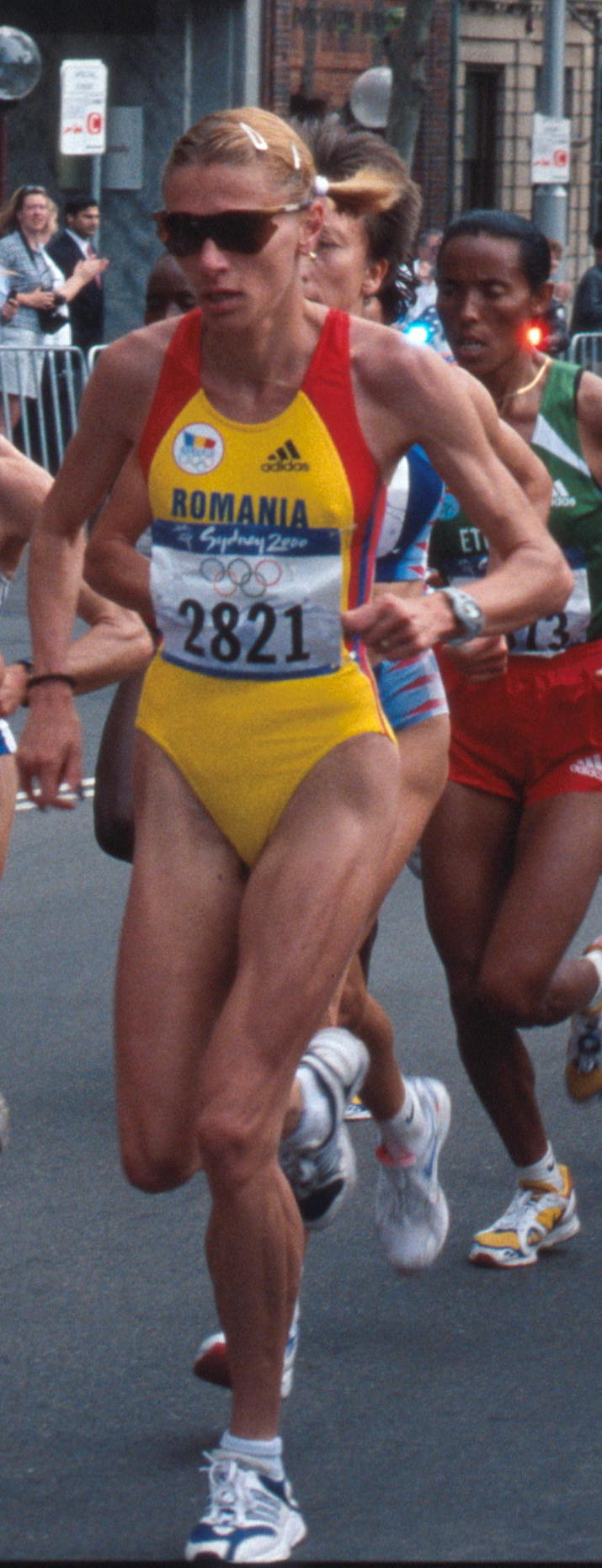
- Gherasim competing in the marathon, Sydney Olympics 2000

Personal information
- Born: 10 November 1971 (age 54) Galaţi, Romania

Sport
- Sport: Track and field
Medal record
Representing Romania
Summer Universiade
Silver medal – second place	1995 Fukuoka	10,000 m
Bronze medal – third place	1993 Buffalo	10,000 m

Camelia Alina Gherasim (née Tecuţă, born 10 November 1971) is a Romanian long-distance runner. Gherasim competed in the marathon at the 2000 Summer Olympics. She has won a number of road races including the 1996 Paris Marathon, the 2005 Monaco Marathon (2:43:44), and the 2006 California International Marathon (2:34:23).

== Doping ==
Gherasim tested positive for anabolic steroids at the Amsterdam Marathon in 2002 and received a two-year doping ban.

== Achievements ==
Year	Competition	Venue	Position	Event	Notes
Representing Romania
1996	Paris Marathon	Paris, France	1st	Marathon	2:29:32
1996	Reims Marathon	Reims, France	1st	Marathon	2:34:01
1997	Paris Half Marathon	Paris, France	1st	Half marathon	1:09:37
1997	Marrakech Marathon	Marrakesh, Morocco	1st	Marathon	
1997	Paris Marathon	Paris, France	2nd	Marathon	
1997	World Championships	Athens, Greece	—	Marathon	DNF
1997	Bordeaux Marathon	Bordeaux, France	2nd	Marathon	
1998	Paris Marathon	Paris, France	2nd	Marathon	
1998	European Championships	Budapest, Hungary	—	Marathon	DNF
1999	Paris Marathon	Paris, France	4th	Marathon	
1999	World Championships	Seville, Spain	25th	Marathon	2:39:29
2000	Paris Marathon	Paris, France	2nd	Marathon	2:28:18
2001	Paris Marathon	Paris, France	3rd	Marathon	2:29:16
2001	World Championships	Edmonton, Canada	30th	Marathon	2:38:19
2002	Amsterdam Marathon	Amsterdam, Netherlands	5th DSQ	Marathon	2:29:29
2005	Monaco Marathon	Monte Carlo, Monaco	1st	Marathon	2:43:44
2006	Marrakech Marathon	Marrakesh, Morocco	1st	Marathon	2:43:49
2006	Nagoya Marathon	Nagoya, Japan	4th	Marathon	2:29:30
2006	Paris Marathon	Paris, France	5th	Marathon	2:31:16
2006	European Championships	Gothenburg, Sweden	17th	Marathon	2:37:57
2006	California International Marathon	Sacramento, United States	1st	Marathon	2:34:23
2007	Nagoya Marathon	Nagoya, Japan	10th	Marathon	2:32:33
2007	Caen Marathon	Caen, France	1st	Marathon	2:42:22
2007	World Championships	Osaka, Japan	28th	Marathon	2:41:40
2010	Caen Marathon	Caen, France	1st	Marathon	2:32:19
