= Maura Viceconte =

Italian long-distance runner (1967–2019)

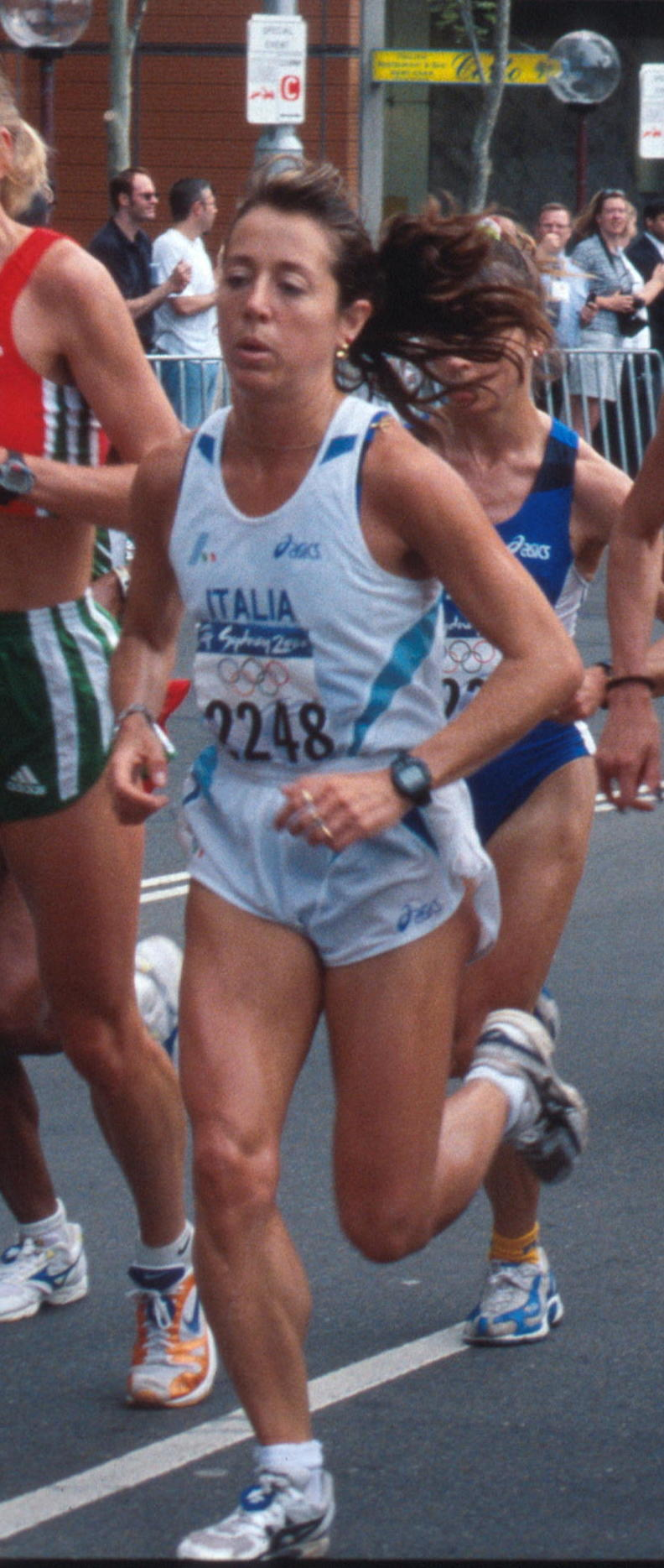
- Maura Viceconte at Sydney Olympics 2000

Personal information
- Born: 3 October 1967 Susa, Italy
- Died: 10 February 2019 (aged 51) Chiusa di San Michele, Italy
- Height: 1.56 m (5 ft 1 1/2 in)
- Weight: 47 kg (104 lb)

Sport
- Country: Italy
- Sport: Athletics
- Event: Marathon
- Coached by: Renato Canova

Achievements and titles
- Personal bests: Half marathon: 1:09:19 (2001); Marathon: 2:23.47 (2000)
Medal record
Women's athletics
Representing Italy
European Championships
Bronze medal – third place	1998 Budapest	Marathon
European Marathon Cup
Silver medal – second place	1998 Budapest	Team event

Maura Viceconte (3 October 1967 – 10 February 2019) was an Italian long-distance runner who represented her native country twice (1996 and 2000) at the Summer Olympics.

== Career ==
Viceconte is best known for winning the bronze medal at the 1998 European Championships in Budapest, Hungary. She won nearly all of the 14 marathons she raced in, including Rome (1999), Vienna (2000), and Prague (2001).

Her personal best time of 2:23:47 hours set at the Vienna City Marathon in 2000 stood as the Italian national record until April 2012, when it was beaten by Valeria Straneo.

In 2018, a documentary film about her life, La Vita è un Maratona (Life is a Marathon) was premiered in Italy.

== Personal life ==
Viceconte had one son in her early 40s.

Viceconte developed breast cancer in her 40s, which was successfully treated. She died on 10 February 2019 at the age of 51. The manner of death was suicide.

== Achievements ==
Year	Competition	Venue	Position	Event	Notes
1995	Venice Marathon	Venice, Italy	1st	Marathon	2:29:11
1996	Olympic Games	Atlanta, United States	—	Marathon	DNF
1997	Monaco Marathon	Monte Carlo, Monaco	1st	Marathon	2:28:16
1998	Italian Marathon	Carpi, Italy	1st	Marathon	2:31:23
1998	European Championships	Budapest, Hungary	3rd	Marathon	2:28:31
1999	Rome City Marathon	Rome, Italy	1st	Marathon	2:29:36
2000	Vienna Marathon	Vienna, Austria	1st	Marathon	2:23:47
2000	Olympic Games	Sydney, Australia	12th	Marathon	2:29:26
2001	Prague Marathon	Prague, Czech Republic	1st	Marathon	2:26:33

== See also ==
- Italian all-time lists - 5000 metres
- Italian all-time lists - 10000 metres
- Italian all-time lists - Half marathon
- Italian all-time lists - Marathon
