= Gáspár Csere =

Hungarian long-distance runner

Personal information
- Nationality: Hungarian
- Born: 12 August 1991 (age 34)

Sport
- Sport: Track and field
- Event: Marathon

Gáspár Csere (born 12 August 1991) is a Hungarian long-distance runner who specialises in the marathon. He competed in the men's marathon event at the 2016 Summer Olympics. In 2018, he competed in the men's marathon at the 2018 European Athletics Championships held in Berlin, Germany. He finished in 29th place. In October, 2020, he won the Budapest Marathon in 2:17:43. His P.R. in the discipline is 2:14:34 which he set in Amsterdam in 2021.
