= Oh Mi-ja =

South Korean long-distance runner

Personal information
- Nationality: South Korean
- Born: 3 July 1970 (age 55)

Sport
- Sport: Long-distance running
- Event: Marathon

Oh Mi-ja (born 3 July 1970) is a South Korean long-distance runner. She competed in the women's marathon at the 1996 Summer Olympics and the 2000 Summer Olympics.
