= Takayuki Inubushi =

Japanese long-distance runner

Personal information
- Native name: 犬伏 孝行
- Nationality: Japanese
- Born: 11 August 1972 (age 53) Yamakawa, Tokushima, Japan

Sport
- Sport: Long-distance running
- Event: Marathon

Takayuki Inubushi (犬伏 孝行, Inubushi Takayuki; born 11 August 1972) is a Japanese long-distance runner. He competed in the men's marathon at the 2000 Summer Olympics.
