= Judit Földing-Nagy =

Hungarian marathon runner

Personal information
- Born: 9 December 1965 (age 60) Győr, Hungary

Sport
- Sport: Marathon running

Judit Földing-Nagy (in Hungary: Földingné Nagy Judit, born 9 December 1965) is a Hungarian runner who specializes in the marathon. She was born in Győr, Győr-Moson-Sopron. She is the current Hungarian record-holder in marathon. She was a bronze medallist at the IAU 100 km European Championships in 2012.

== Achievements ==
Year	Competition	Venue	Position	Event	Notes
Representing Hungary
1990	Hamburg Marathon	Hamburg, West Germany	1st	Marathon	2:33:46
1990	European Championships	Split, SFR Yugoslavia	5th	Marathon	2:37.46
1990	Reims Marathon	Reims, France	1st	Marathon	2:41:53
1993	World Championships	Stuttgart, Germany	15th	Marathon	2:41:06
1993	Reims Marathon	Reims, France	1st	Marathon	2:32:07
1994	European Championships	Helsinki, Finland	13th	Marathon	2:37:22
1995	Paris Marathon	Paris, France	1st	Marathon	2:31:43
1995	World Championships	Gothenburg, Sweden	23rd	Marathon	2:42:03
1996	Olympic Games	Atlanta, United States	36th	Marathon	2:38:43
1997	World Championships	Athens, Greece	22nd	Marathon	2:42:21
1998	European Championships	Budapest, Hungary	14th	Marathon	2:34:00
1999	Lisbon Marathon	Lisbon, Portugal	1st	Marathon	2:32:22
2000	Olympic Games	Sydney, Australia	17th	Marathon	2:30:54
2001	Monaco Marathon	Monte Carlo, Monaco	1st	Marathon	2:38:24
2001	Paris Marathon	Paris, France	7th	Marathon	2:33:26
2002	European Championships	Munich, Germany	10th	Marathon	2:37:33

2012 – 100 km World Championship in Seregno, Italy - 6th

2012 – 100 km European Championship in Seregno, Italy - 3rd

=== Personal bests ===
- Half marathon - 1:12:05 hrs (1998)
- Marathon - 2:28:50 hrs (1996)
