= Gábor Józsa =

Hungarian long-distance runner

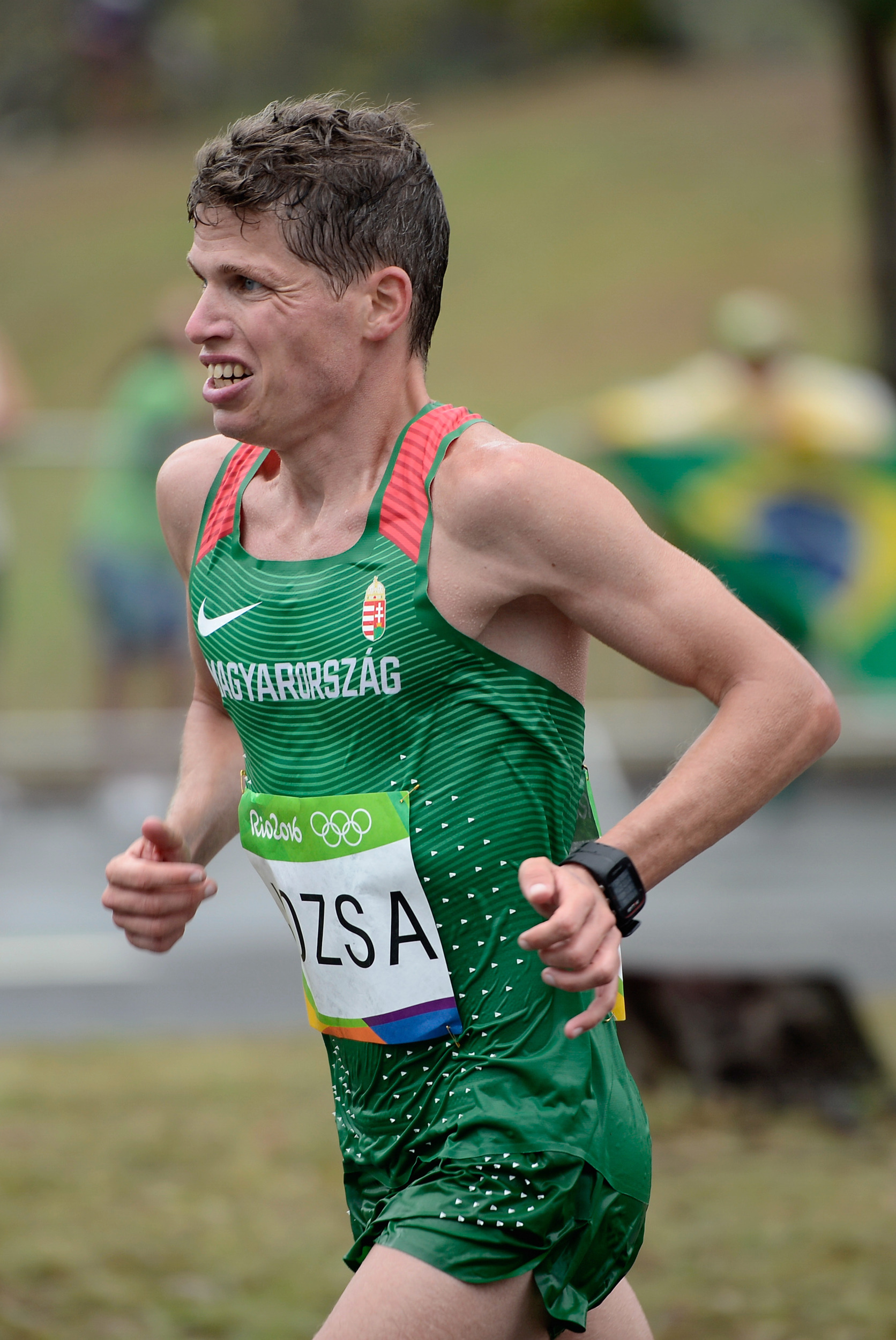
- Józsa at the 2016 Olympics

Personal information
- Born: 18 August 1983 (age 42)
- Height: 170 cm (5 ft 7 in)
- Weight: 59 kg (130 lb)

Sport
- Sport: Track and field
- Event: 10,000 m – marathon
- Club: Magyar AC, Budapest
- Coached by: Janos Torok

Achievements and titles
- Personal best(s): 10,000 m – 30:17.61 (2013); HM – 1:06:21 (2013); Marathon – 2:16:53 (2016)

Gábor Józsa (born 18 August 1983) is a Hungarian long-distance runner. He finished 87th in the marathon at the 2016 Summer Olympics. In 1998 Józsa took up orienteering, and became an international competitor in this sport. He changed to athletics in 2002. He works in the information technology field.
