= List of flag bearers for Malawi at the Olympics =

Malawi at the Olympics
- IOC code: MAW
- NOC: Olympic and Commonwealth Games Association of Malawi
- Website: www.moc.org.mw
- Medals: Gold 0 Silver 0 Bronze 0 Total 0

Summer appearances
- 1972; 1976–1980; 1984; 1988; 1992; 1996; 2000; 2004; 2008; 2012; 2016; 2020; 2024

Other related appearances
- Rhodesia (1960)

This is a list of flag bearers who have represented Malawi at the Olympics.

Flag bearers carry the national flag of their country at the opening ceremony of the Olympic Games.

#	Event year	Season	Flag bearer	Sport
1	1972	Summer	Martin Matupi	Athletics
2	1984	Summer	Fletcher Kapito	Boxing
3	1988	Summer	George Mambosasa	Athletics
4	1992	Summer		
5	1996	Summer	John Mwathiwa	Athletics
6	2000	Summer	Francis Munthali	Athletics
7	2004	Summer	Kondwani Chiwina	Athletics
8	2008	Summer	Charlton Nyirenda	Swimming
9	2012	Summer	Mike Tebulo	Athletics
10	2016	Summer	Kefasi Chitsala	Athletics
11	2020	Summer	Areneo David	Archery
11	2020	Summer	Jessica Makwenda	Swimming
12	2024	Summer	Filipe Gomes	Swimming
12	2024	Summer	Asimenye Simwaka	Athletics

== See also ==
- Malawi at the Olympics
