= 1996 IAAF World Cross Country Championships – Senior men's race =

Senior men's race at the 1996 IAAF World Cross Country Championships
- Organisers: IAAF
- Edition: 24th
- Date: March 23
- Host city: Stellenbosch, Western Cape, South Africa
- Venue: Danie Craven Stadium
- Events: 1
- Distances: 12.15 km – Senior men
- Participation: 281 athletes from 56 nations

The Senior men's race at the 1996 IAAF World Cross Country Championships was held in Stellenbosch, South Africa, at the Danie Craven Stadium on March 23, 1996. A preview on the event was given in the Glasgow Herald, and a report in The New York Times.

Complete results, medallists, and the results of British athletes were published.

== Race results ==
=== Senior men's race (12.15 km) ===
==== Individual ====
Rank	Athlete	Country	Time
1st place, gold medalist(s)	Kenenisa Bekele	Kenya	33:44
2nd place, silver medalist(s)	Salah Hissou	Morocco	33:56
3rd place, bronze medalist(s)	Ismael Kirui	Kenya	33:57
4	Paul Koech	Kenya	34:10
5	Haile Gebrselassie	Ethiopia	34:28
6	Joseph Kimani	Kenya	34:30
7	Khalid Skah	Morocco	34:34
8	Smail Sghir	Morocco	34:34
9	William Kiptum	Kenya	34:35
10	Josephat Machuka	Kenya	34:37
11	Abraham Assefa	Ethiopia	34:55
12	Jon Brown	United Kingdom	34:55
13	Abderrahim Zitouna	Morocco	35:00
14	Stephen Arusei	Kenya	35:01
15	Shadrack Hoff	South Africa	35:04
16	Steve Moneghetti	Australia	35:04
17	Habte Jifar	Ethiopia	35:05
18	Fita Bayissa	Ethiopia	35:09
19	Alejandro Gómez	Spain	35:14
20	Mustapha Essaïd	France	35:15
21	Ayele Mezegebu	Ethiopia	35:23
22	José Manuel García	Spain	35:25
23	James Songok	Kenya	35:29
24	John Gilay	Tanzania	35:30
25	Julian Paynter	Australia	35:31
26	Domingos Castro	Portugal	35:33
27	Daniel Ferreira	Brazil	35:35
28	John Nuttall	United Kingdom	35:38
29	Mustapha Bamouh	Morocco	35:40
30	Kamiel Maase	Netherlands	35:40
31	Arnold Mächler	Switzerland	35:42
32	Antonio Serrano	Spain	35:47
33	Antonio Pérez	Spain	35:49
34	Andrew Panga	Tanzania	35:50
35	Chala Kelele	Ethiopia	35:51
36	Carlos Grisales	Colombia	35:53
37	Gennaro Di Napoli	Italy	35:55
38	António Pinto	Portugal	35:56
39	Girma Tolla	Ethiopia	35:56
40	Khaled Boulami	Morocco	35:57
41	Brian Baker	United States	35:57
42	Yann Millon	France	35:59
43	Christian Leuprecht	Italy	35:59
44	Owen MacHelm	South Africa	36:00
45	Rob Denmark	United Kingdom	36:01
46	Juan Ramón Muñoz	Spain	36:04
47	Marko Hwahu	Tanzania	36:05
48	Stefano Baldini	Italy	36:06
49	Shaun Creighton	Australia	36:06
50	John Morapedi	South Africa	36:07
51	Andrew Pearson	United Kingdom	36:07
52	Mohamed Issangar	Morocco	36:11
53	Carlos de la Torre	Spain	36:13
54	Abdelaziz Sahere	Morocco	36:16
55	Julio Rey	Spain	36:17
56	Godfrey Koki	Zimbabwe	36:17
57	Keith Cullen	United Kingdom	36:17
58	Róbert Štefko	Slovakia	36:18
59	Darius Burrows	United Kingdom	36:19
60	Alfredo Bráz	Portugal	36:19
61	James Kariuki	Kenya	36:20
62	Greg van Hest	Netherlands	36:21
63	Takahiro Sunada	Japan	36:21
64	Angelo Carosi	Italy	36:22
65	Pedro Rojas	Colombia	36:22
66	Lee Troop	Australia	36:27
67	Robbie Johnston	New Zealand	36:27
68	Jason Cameron	New Zealand	36:27
69	Pablo Olmedo	Mexico	36:31
70	Martin Rodríguez	Mexico	36:31
71	Nigousse Urge	Ethiopia	36:32
72	Tadeo Nada	Tanzania	36:32
73	Faustine Shauri	Tanzania	36:32
74	Sérgio da Silva	Brazil	36:34
75	Francesco Panetta	Italy	36:34
76	Abdellah Béhar	France	36:35
77	Claes Nyberg	Sweden	36:36
78	Brahim Boulami	Morocco	36:37
79	Bertrand Frechard	France	36:37
80	Fungai Kapanyota	Zimbabwe	36:37
81	Peter Mavura	Zimbabwe	36:37
82	Jeff Campbell	United States	36:41
83	Carlos Patrício	Portugal	36:44
84	José Ramon Moreno	Spain	36:48
85	Salvatore Bettiol	Italy	36:50
86	Meshack Mogotsi	South Africa	36:51
87	Chris Sweeney	United Kingdom	36:52
88	Kerry Rodger	New Zealand	36:53
89	Sam Molokomme	South Africa	36:53
90	Adalberto Garcia	Brazil	36:54
91	Chris Weber	Canada	36:56
92	Vítor Almeida	Portugal	36:58
93	John Mwathiwa	Malawi	36:58
94	Tim Gannon	United States	36:59
95	Simon Morolong	South Africa	37:00
96	Ezael Thlobo	South Africa	37:01
97	Valery Chesak	Ukraine	37:02
98	Joaquim Silva	Portugal	37:04
99	Peter van der Velden	Netherlands	37:05
100	Aron Shipanga	Namibia	37:06
101	Phillip Clode	New Zealand	37:06
102	Godfrey Nyombi	Uganda	37:07
103	Viktor Röthlin	Switzerland	37:09
104	Éder Fialho	Brazil	37:10
105	Stéphane Rousseau	Belgium	37:10
106	William Roldán	Colombia	37:11
107	Noel Cullen	Ireland	37:12
108	Henry Moyo	Malawi	37:13
109	Pere Arco	Spain	37:15
110	Carlos Peña	Mexico	37:15
111	Jonathan Wyatt	New Zealand	37:16
112	Ayele Setegne	Israel	37:17
113	Alex Malinga	Uganda	37:18
114	Phil Costley	New Zealand	37:20
115	Petri Kuusinen	Finland	37:21
116	Kamfya Kenneth	Zambia	37:22
117	Jeff Schiebler	Canada	37:22
118	Phillip Sly	Australia	37:23
119	Daniel Held	United States	37:23
120	Masami Tsujinaka	Japan	37:28
121	Bradley Kirk	United States	37:30
122	Marc Vanderstraeten	Belgium	37:32
123	Darren Lynch	Australia	37:32
124	Bhairav Singh	India	37:33
125	Marcel Laros	Netherlands	37:33
126	Robert Cook Jr.	United States	37:33
127	Jonathan Hume	United States	37:34
128	Dominique Chauvelier	France	37:35
129	Adrian Passey	United Kingdom	37:36
130	Jurmain Mitchell	Jamaica	37:38
131	Ronald Mujuni	Uganda	37:39
132	Jason Bunston	Canada	37:43
133	Bertrand Itsweire	France	37:43
134	Filip van Damme	Belgium	37:44
135	Daniel Sibandze	Eswatini	37:45
136	Joseph Tjitunga	Namibia	37:48
137	Jos Maes	Belgium	37:50
138	Meck Mothuli	South Africa	37:50
139	Francis Munthali	Malawi	37:51
140	Veli-Matti Ranta	Finland	37:51
141	José Orlando Sánchez Guerrero	Colombia	37:53
142	Isaac Simelane	Eswatini	37:54
143	Kabo Gabaseme	Botswana	37:54
144	Viktor Karpenko	Ukraine	37:55
145	Marcel Versteeg	Netherlands	37:55
146	Adamou Aboubakar	Cameroon	37:56
147	Leonardo Guedes	Brazil	38:00
148	Elenilson da Silva	Brazil	38:00
149	Tsungai Mwanengeni	Zimbabwe	38:02
150	Aleksandr Kuzin	Ukraine	38:02
151	Steve Harris	United Kingdom	38:06
152	Ron van Diepen	Netherlands	38:08
153	Stephan Paessens	Belgium	38:10
154	Sergiy Lebid	Ukraine	38:10
155	Ray Boyd	Australia	38:14
156	Thorsten Naumann	Germany	38:15
157	Clement Omagoro	Uganda	38:16
158	Miroslav Vanko	Slovakia	38:17
159	André Green	Germany	38:18
160	Benito Mpwewe	Tanzania	38:18
161	Seamus Power	Ireland	38:19
162	Rafael Muñoz	Mexico	38:19
163	Sebastiano Mazzara	Italy	38:19
164	Mathieu Kouanotso	Cameroon	38:21
165	Oliver Kandiero	Zimbabwe	38:23
166	Francisco Sanchez	Colombia	38:23
167	Martin Horacek	Czech Republic	38:26
168	Redmal Singh	India	38:27
169	Gulab Chand	India	38:27
170	Dinesh Kumar	India	38:27
171	Jamie Lewis	Ireland	38:30
172	Hisayuki Okawa	Japan	38:31
173	Lesedinyana Lekgoa	Botswana	38:32
174	Elphas Ginindza	Eswatini	38:33
175	Dragoslav Prpa	Yugoslavia	38:33
176	Anil Kumar	India	38:33
177	Ben Chesang	Uganda	38:37
178	Laurent Mbissah	Cameroon	38:41
179	Brad Schlapak	United States	38:41
180	Paul McCloy	Canada	38:42
181	Seamus McElligott	United States	38:42
182	Goran Raičević	Yugoslavia	38:42
183	Noah Chilongoshi	Zambia	38:43
184	Bethold Karumendu	Namibia	38:44
185	Zachariah Ditetso	Botswana	38:44
186	Abdul Sameer Moos	Mauritius	38:45
187	Simone Zanon	Italy	38:48
188	André Bucher	Switzerland	38:49
189	Artur Santiago	Angola	38:50
190	Igor Sidorenko	Ukraine	38:50
191	Tom van Hooste	Belgium	38:52
192	Jukka Vähä-Vahe	Finland	38:53
193	Milton Andabati	Uganda	38:54
194	Sumer Singh	India	38:56
195	Kokolia Mokonyana	Lesotho	38:56
196	Percy Sephoda	Lesotho	38:56
197	Pauric McKinney	Ireland	38:56
198	Henno Haava	Estonia	38:57
199	Menon Ramsamy	Mauritius	39:00
200	Boaz Matsiko	Uganda	39:03
201	Kefemawg Selogilwe	Botswana	39:04
202	Tsai Ching-Chou	Chinese Taipei	39:04
203	Jussi Virtanen	Finland	39:09
204	Zambis Champi	Botswana	39:11
205	Yuichi Tajiri	Japan	39:17
206	Bhekumusa Simelane	Eswatini	39:21
207	Andrey Gladishev	Ukraine	39:24
208	Makhosonke Fika	South Africa	39:25
209	Carlos Morelos	Mexico	39:26
210	Alan Merriman	Ireland	39:29
211	Eissa Abou Daif	Egypt	39:30
212	Pierewit Wilders	Namibia	39:37
213	Jari Venäläinen	Finland	39:40
214	Pierre Foka	Cameroon	39:42
215	Marko Kotila	Finland	39:46
216	Luke Madongo	Eswatini	39:49
217	Cheikh Boye	Senegal	39:56
218	Elengha Obvo	Congo	39:58
219	Ajay Chuttoo	Mauritius	39:59
220	Bruno Le Stum	France	40:01
221	Thabang Lebota	Lesotho	40:04
222	Adelino Oliveira	Mozambique	40:08
223	Alex Oldete	Namibia	40:11
224	Ivan Celic	Croatia	40:13
225	Emil Roman	Namibia	40:13
226	Freddy Silva	Colombia	40:13
227	Radames Bonjele	Mozambique	40:15
228	Jouni Rinne	Finland	40:18
229	Linton McKenzie	Jamaica	40:26
230	Abdoulka Soumah	France	40:27
231	Modise Ndibicha	Botswana	40:36
232	Satish Huryl	Mauritius	40:37
233	Andrzej Magier	Poland	40:38
234	Nils Antonio	Jamaica	40:39
235	Patrick Moonsamy	Mauritius	40:43
236	Pat Mabuza	Eswatini	40:47
237	Robert de Vido	Hong Kong	40:57
238	Delmore Delevante	Jamaica	41:00
239	Philip Kamane	Papua New Guinea	41:05
240	Bruno Armance	Mauritius	41:21
241	Mike Felicite	Mauritius	41:22
242	Michael Tomlin	Jamaica	41:25
243	Emmanuel Milonya	Malawi	41:29
244	Michael Nejedly	Czech Republic	41:29
245	Eston Phiri	Malawi	41:46
246	Morris Manai	Papua New Guinea	41:52
247	Prosnattam Lal	Fiji	41:54
248	Mohlalefi Sepqane	Lesotho	42:22
249	Sau Wai	Papua New Guinea	42:24
250	Mishack Myula	Malawi	42:33
251	Robert John	Papua New Guinea	42:34
252	Jeff Lockyer	Canada	42:44
253	Delroy Hayden	Jamaica	42:47
254	Davendra Pradesh Singh	Fiji	43:06
255	Ken Mova	Papua New Guinea	43:09
256	Ashok Kumar	Fiji	43:37
257	Isireli Naikelekelevesi	Fiji	44:18
258	Tony Green	Papua New Guinea	44:18
259	Medley Laban	Papua New Guinea	45:10
260	Jitendra Prakash	Fiji	45:16
261	Bimiesh Kumar	Fiji	45:33
—	Artur Castro	Brazil	DNF
—	Cormac Finnerty	Ireland	DNF
—	Paulo Guerra	Portugal	DNF
—	Philimon Hanneck	Zimbabwe	DNF
—	Eduardo Henriques	Portugal	DNF
—	Vincenzo Modica	Italy	DNF
—	José Regalo	Portugal	DNF
—	Teppo Jalonen	Finland	DNF
—	René Godlieb	Netherlands	DNF
—	Dale Warrander	New Zealand	DNF
—	Didier Sainthorand	France	DNF
—	Tesfaye Tafa	Ethiopia	DNF
—	John Downes	Ireland	DNF
—	Alejandro Cuahtepizi	Mexico	DNF
—	Gairat Nigmatov	Tajikistan	DNF
—	David Burke	Ireland	DNF
—	Anatoli Statskejevitsh	Belarus	DNF
—	Kennedy Masese	Malawi	DNF
—	Jevgeni Solovjev	Tajikistan	DNF
—	Derick Zhanda	Zambia	DNF

==== Teams ====
Rank	Team	Points
1st place, gold medalist(s)	Kenya: Paul Tergat / 1; Ismael Kirui / 3; Paul Koech / 4; Joseph Kimani / 6; William Kiptum / 9; Josephat Machuka / 10; (Stephen Arusei) / (14); (James Songok) / (23); (James Kariuki) / (61)	33
2nd place, silver medalist(s)	Morocco: Salah Hissou / 2; Khalid Skah / 7; Smail Sghir / 8; Abderrahim Zitouna / 13; Mustapha Bamouh / 29; Khaled Boulami / 40; (Mohamed Issangar) / (52); (Abdelaziz Sahere) / (54); (Brahim Boulami) / (78)	99
3rd place, bronze medalist(s)	Ethiopia: Haile Gebrselassie / 5; Abraham Assefa / 11; Habte Jifar / 17; Fita Bayissa / 18; Ayele Mezegebu / 21; Chala Kelele / 35; (Girma Tolla) / (39); (Nigousse Urge) / (71); (Tesfaye Tafa) / (DNF)	107
4	Spain: Alejandro Gómez / 19; José Manuel García / 22; Antonio Serrano / 32; Antonio Pérez / 33; Juan Ramón Muñoz / 46; Carlos de la Torre / 53; (Julio Rey) / (55); (José Ramon Moreno) / (84); (Pere Arco) / (109)	205
5	United Kingdom: Jon Brown / 12; John Nuttall / 28; Rob Denmark / 45; Andrew Pearson / 51; Keith Cullen / 57; Darius Burrows / 59; (Chris Sweeney) / (87); (Adrian Passey) / (129); (Steve Harris) / (151)	252
6	Italy: Gennaro Di Napoli / 37; Christian Leuprecht / 43; Stefano Baldini / 48; Angelo Carosi / 64; Francesco Panetta / 75; Salvatore Bettiol / 85; (Sebastiano Mazzara) / (163); (Simone Zanon) / (187); (Vincenzo Modica) / (DNF)	352
7	South Africa: Shadrack Hoff / 15; Owen MacHelm / 44; John Morapedi / 50; Meshack Mogotsi / 86; Sam Molokomme / 89; Simon Morolong / 95; (Ezael Thlobo) / (96); (Meck Mothuli) / (138); (Makhosonke Fika) / (208)	379
8	Portugal: Domingos Castro / 26; António Pinto / 38; Alfredo Bráz / 60; Carlos Patrício / 83; Vítor Almeida / 92; Joaquim Silva / 98; (Paulo Guerra) / (DNF); (Eduardo Henriques) / (DNF); (José Regalo) / (DNF)	397
9	Australia: Steve Moneghetti / 16; Julian Paynter / 25; Shaun Creighton / 49; Lee Troop / 66; Phillip Sly / 118; Darren Lynch / 123; (Ray Boyd) / (155)	397
10	Tanzania: John Gilay / 24; Andrew Panga / 34; Marko Hwahu / 47; Tadeo Nada / 72; Faustine Shauri / 73; Benito Mpwewe / 160	410
11	France: Mustapha Essaïd / 20; Yann Millon / 42; Abdellah Béhar / 76; Bertrand Frechard / 79; Dominique Chauvelier / 128; Bertrand Itsweire / 133; (Bruno Le Stum) / (220); (Abdoulka Soumah) / (230); (Didier Sainthorand) / (DNF)	478
12	New Zealand: Robbie Johnston / 67; Jason Cameron / 68; Kerry Rodger / 88; Phillip Clode / 101; Jonathan Wyatt / 111; Phil Costley / 114; (Dale Warrander) / (DNF)	549
13	United States: Brian Baker / 41; Jeff Campbell / 82; Tim Gannon / 94; Daniel Held / 119; Bradley Kirk / 121; Robert Cook Jr. / 126; (Jonathan Hume) / (127); (Brad Schlapak) / (179); (Seamus McElligott) / (181)	583
14	Brazil: Daniel Ferreira / 27; Sérgio da Silva / 74; Adalberto Garcia / 90; Éder Fialho / 104; Leonardo Guedes / 147; Elenilson da Silva / 148; (Artur Castro) / (DNF)	590
15	Netherlands: Kamiel Maase / 30; Greg van Hest / 62; Peter van der Velden / 99; Marcel Laros / 125; Marcel Versteeg / 145; Ron van Diepen / 152; (René Godlieb) / (DNF)	613
16	Colombia: Carlos Grisales / 36; Pedro Rojas / 65; William Roldán / 106; José Orlando Sánchez Guerrero / 141; Francisco Sanchez / 166; Freddy Silva / 226	740
17	Belgium: Stéphane Rousseau / 105; Marc Vanderstraeten / 122; Filip van Damme / 134; Jos Maes / 137; Stephan Paessens / 153; Tom van Hooste / 191	842
18	Uganda: Godfrey Nyombi / 102; Alex Malinga / 113; Ronald Mujuni / 131; Clement Omagoro / 157; Ben Chesang / 177; Milton Andabati / 193; (Boaz Matsiko) / (200)	873
19	Ukraine: Valery Chesak / 97; Viktor Karpenko / 144; Aleksandr Kuzin / 150; Sergiy Lebid / 154; Igor Sidorenko / 190; Andrey Gladishev / 207	942
20	India: Bhairav Singh / 124; Redmal Singh / 168; Gulab Chand / 169; Dinesh Kumar / 170; Anil Kumar / 176; Sumer Singh / 194	1001
21	Finland: Petri Kuusinen / 115; Veli-Matti Ranta / 140; Jukka Vähä-Vahe / 192; Jussi Virtanen / 203; Jari Venäläinen / 213; Marko Kotila / 215; (Jouni Rinne) / (228); (Teppo Jalonen) / (DNF)	1078
22	Malawi: John Mwathiwa / 93; Henry Moyo / 108; Francis Munthali / 139; Emmanuel Milonya / 243; Eston Phiri / 245; Mishack Myula / 250; (Kennedy Masese) / (DNF)	1078
23	Namibia: Aron Shipanga / 100; Joseph Tjitunga / 136; Bethold Karumendu / 184; Pierewit Wilders / 212; Alex Oldete / 223; Emil Roman / 225	1080
24	Eswatini: Daniel Sibandze / 135; Isaac Simelane / 142; Elphas Ginindza / 174; Bhekumusa Simelane / 206; Luke Madongo / 216; Pat Mabuza / 236	1109
25	Botswana: Kabo Gabaseme / 143; Lesedinyana Lekgoa / 173; Zachariah Ditetso / 185; Kefemawg Selogilwe / 201; Zambis Champi / 204; Modise Ndibicha / 231	1137
26	Mauritius: Abdul Sameer Moos / 186; Menon Ramsamy / 199; Ajay Chuttoo / 219; Satish Huryl / 232; Patrick Moonsamy / 235; Bruno Armance / 240; (Mike Felicite) / (241)	1311
27	Jamaica: Jurmain Mitchell / 130; Linton McKenzie / 229; Nils Antonio / 234; Delmore Delevante / 238; Michael Tomlin / 242; Delroy Hayden / 253	1326
28	Papua New Guinea: Philip Kamane / 239; Morris Manai / 246; Sau Wai / 249; Robert John / 251; Ken Mova / 255; Tony Green / 258; (Medley Laban) / (259)	1498
29	Fiji: Prosnattam Lal / 247; Davendra Pradesh Singh / 254; Ashok Kumar / 256; Isireli Naikelekelevesi / 257; Jitendra Prakash / 260; Bimiesh Kumar / 261	1535
DNF	Zimbabwe: (Godfrey Koki) / (56); (Fungai Kapanyota) / (80); (Peter Mavura) / (81); (Tsungai Mwanengeni) / (149); (Oliver Kandiero) / (165); (Philimon Hanneck) / (DNF)	DNF
DNF	Mexico: (Pablo Olmedo) / (69); (Martin Rodríguez) / (70); (Carlos Peña) / (110); (Rafael Muñoz) / (162); (Carlos Morelos) / (209); (Alejandro Cuahtepizi) / (DNF)	DNF
DNF	Ireland: (Noel Cullen) / (107); (Seamus Power) / (161); (Jamie Lewis) / (171); (Pauric McKinney) / (197); (Alan Merriman) / (210); (Cormac Finnerty) / (DNF); (John Downes) / (DNF); (David Burke) / (DNF)	DNF

- Note: Athletes in parentheses did not score for the team result

== Participation ==
An unofficial count yields the participation of 281 athletes from 56 countries in the Senior men's race. This is in agreement with the official numbers as published.

- Angola (1)
- Australia (7)
- Belarus (1)
- Belgium (6)
- Botswana (6)
- Brazil (7)
- Cameroon (4)
- Canada (5)
- Chinese Taipei (1)
- Colombia (6)
- Congo (1)
- Croatia (1)
- Czech Republic (2)
- Egypt (1)
- Estonia (1)
- Ethiopia (9)
- Fiji (6)
- Finland (8)
- France (9)
- Germany (2)
- Hong Kong (1)
- India (6)
- Ireland (8)
- Israel (1)
- Italy (9)
- Jamaica (6)
- Japan (4)
- Kenya (9)
- Lesotho (4)
- Malawi (7)
- Mauritius (7)
- Mexico (6)
- Morocco (9)
- Mozambique (2)
- Namibia (6)
- Netherlands (7)
- New Zealand (7)
- Papua New Guinea (7)
- Poland (1)
- Portugal (9)
- Senegal (1)
- Slovakia (2)
- South Africa (9)
- Spain (9)
- Eswatini (6)
- Sweden (1)
- Switzerland (3)
- Tajikistan (2)
- Tanzania (6)
- Uganda (7)
- Ukraine (6)
- United Kingdom (9)
- United States (9)
- Yugoslavia (2)
- Zambia (3)
- Zimbabwe (6)

== See also ==
- 1996 IAAF World Cross Country Championships – Junior men's race
- 1996 IAAF World Cross Country Championships – Senior women's race
- 1996 IAAF World Cross Country Championships – Junior women's race
