= Malawi at the 2020 Summer Olympics =

- IOC code: MAW
- NOC: Olympic and Commonwealth Games Association of Malawi

in Tokyo, Japan July 23, 2021 – August 8, 2021
- Competitors: 5 in 4 sports
- Flag bearers (opening): Jessica Makwenda; Areneo David
- Flag bearer (closing): N/A
- Medals: Gold 0 Silver 0 Bronze 0 Total 0

Summer Olympics appearances (overview)
- 1972; 1976–1980; 1984; 1988; 1992; 1996; 2000; 2004; 2008; 2012; 2016; 2020; 2024

Other related appearances
- Rhodesia (1960)

Malawi competed at the 2020 Summer Olympics in Tokyo. Originally scheduled to take place from July 24 to August 9, 2020, the Games were postponed to 23 July to 8 August 2021, because of the COVID-19 pandemic. It was the nation's eleventh appearance at the Summer Olympics. Malawi did not attend the 1976 Summer Olympics in Montreal and the 1980 Summer Olympics in Moscow, because of its support to the African and United States-led boycott.

== Competitors ==
The following is the list of number of competitors in the Games.

Sport	Men	Women	Total
Archery	1	0	1
Athletics	0	1	1
Judo	0	1	1
Swimming	1	1	2
Total	2	3	5

== Archery ==
Malawi received an invitation from the Tripartite Commission to send a male archer for the second consecutive time to the Olympic tournament.

Athlete	Event	Ranking round		Round of 64	Round of 32	Round of 16	Quarterfinals	Semifinals	Final / BM	
Athlete	Event	Score	Seed	Opposition Score	Opposition Score	Opposition Score	Opposition Score	Opposition Score	Opposition Score	Rank
Areneo David	Men's individual	562	64	Kim (KOR); L 0–6	Did not advance					

== Athletics ==
Malawi received a universality slot from World Athletics to send a female track and field athlete to the Olympics.

Key

- Note–Ranks given for track events are within the athlete's heat only
- Q = Qualified for the next round
- q = Qualified for the next round as a fastest loser or, in field events, by position without achieving the qualifying target
- NR = National record
- N/A = Round not applicable for the event
- Bye = Athlete not required to compete in round

Track & road events

Athlete	Event	Preliminaries		Heat		Semifinal		Final	
Athlete	Event	Result	Rank	Result	Rank	Result	Rank	Result	Rank
Asimenye Simwaka	Women's 100 m	11.76 NR	2 Q	11.68 NR	8	Did not advance			

== Judo ==
For the first time in history, Malawi received an invitation from the Tripartite Commission and the International Judo Federation to send Harriet Boniface in the women's extra-lightweight category (48 kg) to the Olympics.

Athlete	Event	Round of 32	Round of 16	Quarterfinals	Semifinals	Repechage	Final / BM	
Athlete	Event	Opposition Result	Opposition Result	Opposition Result	Opposition Result	Opposition Result	Opposition Result	Rank
Harriet Boniface	Women's –48 kg	Chibana (BRA); L 00–10	Did not advance					

== Swimming ==
Malawi received a universality invitation from FINA to send two top-ranked swimmers (one per gender) in their respective individual events to the Olympics, based on the FINA Points System of June 28, 2021.

Athlete	Event	Heat		Semifinal		Final	
Athlete	Event	Time	Rank	Time	Rank	Time	Rank
Filipe Gomes	Men's 50 m freestyle	24.00	47	Did not advance			
Jessica Makwenda	Women's 50 m freestyle	28.96	61	Did not advance			
