= List of Malawian records in athletics =

The following are the national records in athletics in Malawi maintained by Athletics Association of Malawi (AAM).

== Outdoor ==
Key to tables: Awaiting ratification Record not kept by AAM Not ratified or later rescinded by AAM

=== Men ===
Event	Record	Athlete	Date	Meet	Place	Ref.
100 m	10.33 (+2.0 m/s)	Stern Noel Liffa	8 June 2022	African Championships	Saint Pierre, Mauritius	
100 m	10.2 h NWI	Eston Kaonga	1 February 1976	,	Addis Ababa, Ethiopia	
200 m	21.31 (+0.4 m/s)	Stern Noel Liffa	29 August 2019	African Games	Rabat, Morocco	
200 m	21.2 h NWI	Odiya Silweya	21 June 1987		Zomba, Malawi	
400 m	47.85	Golden Gunde	28 July 2014	Commonwealth Games	Glasgow, United Kingdom	
800 m	1:49.48	Kenneth Dzekedzeke	8 August 1987	All-Africa Games	Nairobi, Kenya	
1500 m	3:42.73	Chauncy Master	11 June 2008		Avellino, Italy	
3000 m	8:25.3	George Mambosasa	25 July 1986	Commonwealth Games	Glasgow, United Kingdom	
5000 m	14:08.0	Rodwell Kamwendo	1 July 2000		Harare, Zimbabwe	
10,000 m	29:11.13	Rodwell Kamwendo	26 July 2002	Commonwealth Games	Manchester, United Kingdom	
Marathon	2:16:04	Mphatso Nadolo	4 December 2021		Gqeberha, South Africa	
110 m hurdles	18.54 NWI (Note: record set during decathlon competition)	Wilfred Ngwenya-Mwalwanda	8 September 1972	Olympic Games	Munich, West Germany	
400 m hurdles	55.5 h	Michael Lewis	1970		Lusaka, Zambia	
3000 m steeplechase						
High jump	2.10 m	Wanangwa Mkandawire	24 June 2006		Birmingham, United Kingdom	
Pole vault	3.81 m	C. Msompha	26 August 1967		Blantyre, Malawi	
Long jump	7.25 m NWI	Lifa Kalungo	16 November 1986		Zomba, Malawi	
Triple jump	14.30 m NWI	Daniel Mkandawire	1970		Blantyre, Malawi	
Shot put	14.90 m	Brian Ngoma	1 July 2001		Harare, Zimbabwe	
Discus throw	42.14 m	Wilfred Ngwenya-Mwalwanda	22 January 1972		Mhangula, Rhodesia	
Hammer throw	23.41 m	Takonwa Phiri	1 July 2001		Harare, Zimbabwe	
Javelin throw	56.93 m	Stanley Mutali	3 July 2005		Harare, Zimbabwe	
Decathlon	6154 pts	Wilfred Ngwenya-Mwalwanda	7–8 September 1972	Olympic Games	Munich, West Germany	
Decathlon	100m / Long jump / Shot put / High jump / 400m / 110m H / Discus / Pole vault / Javelin / 1500m; 11.95 / 5.68 m / 12.27 m / 1.65 m / 52.68 / 18.54 / 38.82 m / 3.30 m / 71.28 m / 4:37.4					
20 km walk (road)						
50 km walk (road)						
4 × 100 m relay	43.2 h	Malawi	24 September 1983		Luanshya, Zambia	
4 × 400 m relay	3:11.97	Malawi; Isaac Ganunga; Odiya Silweya; Kenneth Dzekedzeke; A. Chigwenembe	11 August 1987	All-Africa Games	Nairobi, Kenya	

=== Women ===
Event	Record	Athlete	Date	Meet	Place	Ref.
100 m	11.35 (±0.0 m/s)	Asimenye Simwaka	22 June 2024	African Championships	Douala, Cameroon	
200 m	22.91 (+0.3 m/s)	Asimenye Simwaka	25 June 2024	African Championships	Douala, Cameroon	
400 m	51.55	Asimenye Simwaka	7 August 2022	Commonwealth Games	Birmingham, United Kingdom	
800 m	2:09.16	Gertrude Banda	14 October 2003	All-Africa Games	Abuja, Nigeria	
1500 m	4:26.83	Lucia Chandamale	22 June 2008		Velletri, Italy	
3000 m	9:11.89	Catherine Chikwakwa	25 July 2006	DN Galan	Stockholm, Sweden	
5000 m	15:36.22	Catherine Chikwakwa	13 July 2004		Grosseto, Italy	
10,000 m	35:03.6	Catherine Chikwakwa	3 July 2005		Harare, Zimbabwe	
Half marathon	1:14:31	Catherine Chikwakwa	24 September 2006		Remich, Luxembourg	
25 km (road)	1:35:46+	Tereza Master	27 July 2014	Commonwealth Games	Glasgow, United Kingdom	
30 km (road)	1:59:39+	Tereza Master	27 July 2014	Commonwealth Games	Glasgow, United Kingdom	
Marathon	2:48:34	Tereza Master	14 August 2016	Olympic Games	Rio de Janeiro, Brazil	
100 m hurdles	19.77 (−0.8 m/s)	Juliet Komwa	26 April 2016	McDaniel Twilight Meet	Westminster, United States	
100 m hurdles	16.1 h NWI	Y. Elector	19 July 1969		Blantyre, Malawi	
400 m hurdles	1:04.26	Ambwene Simukonda	5 June 2011		Swansea	
3000 m steeplechase						
High jump	1.47 m	Angelina Maluwa	7 August 1988		Blantyre, Malawi	
Pole vault						
Long jump	5.05 m	Rose Mjojo	26 August 1973		Blantyre, Malawi	
Triple jump	10.25 m	Kachali	20 July 1968		Blantyre, Malawi	
Shot put	11.46 m	Rose Chamangwana	5 September 1975		Mombasa, Kenya	
Discus throw	34.20 m	Rose Chamangwana	5 September 1975		Mombasa, Kenya	
Hammer throw	13.21 m	Ambwene Simukonda	15 August 2015		Tonbridge, United Kingdom	
Javelin throw	29.79 m	Kettie Mkandawire	30 May 2009		Gaborone, Botswana	
Heptathlon						
Heptathlon	100m H / High jump / Shot put / 200m / Long jump / Javelin / 800m					
20 km walk (road)						
50 km walk (road)						
4 × 100 m relay	52.1 h	Malawi; Phiri; Emesia Chizunga; Mabel Saeluska; Missie Misomali	3 December 1972		Dar es Salaam, Tanzania	
4 × 400 m relay	4:09.2 h	Malawi	1 July 2001		Harare, Zimbabwe	

== Indoor ==
=== Men ===
Event	Record	Athlete	Date	Meet	Place	Ref.
50 m	6.66	Ibrahim Moustapher	31 January 2015	USM Open III	Gorham, United States	
60 m	7.20	Ibrahim Moustapher	17 January 2015	Bates Invitational	Lewiston, United States	
200 m	23.69	Ngoni Tengatenga	5 December 2009	Yale Lidlifter Invitational	New Haven, United States	
400 m	50.39	Moses Kondowe	5 March 1999	World Championships	Maebashi, Japan	
800 m	1:54.49	Kondawi Chiwina	5 March 2004	World Championships	Budapest, Hungary	
1500 m	3:58.23	Francis Munthali	10 March 1995	World Championships	Barcelona, Spain	
3000 m						
60 m hurdles						
High jump	2.08 m	Wanangwa Mkandawire	4 February 2006		Cardiff, United Kingdom	
Pole vault						
Long jump						
Triple jump						
Shot put						
Heptathlon						
Heptathlon	60m / Long jump / Shot put / High jump / 60m H / Pole vault / 1000m					
5000 m walk						
4 × 400 m relay						

=== Women ===
Event	Record	Athlete	Date	Meet	Place	Ref.
60 m	8.05	Susan Tengatenga	28 October 2009		Glasgow, United Kingdom	
200 m	25.78	Susan Tengatenga	15 March 2008		Sheffield, United Kingdom	
400 m	55.86	Ambwene Simukonda	15 January 2012		Lee Valley, United States	
800 m						
1500 m						
3000 m						
60 m hurdles						
High jump						
Pole vault						
Long jump						
Triple jump						
Shot put						
Pentathlon						
Pentathlon	60m H / High jump / Shot put / Long jump / 800m					
3000 m walk						
4 × 400 m relay						
