= Malawi at the 2019 African Games =

- Flag of Malawi
- IOC code: MAW
- NOC: Olympic and Commonwealth Games Association of Malawi

in Rabat, Morocco 19 August 2019 – 31 August 2019
- Competitors: 22 (16 men and 6 women) in 7 sports
- Medals: Gold 0 Silver 0 Bronze 0 Total 0

African Games appearances (overview)
- 1987; 1991–1995; 1999; 2003–2007; 2011; 2015; 2019; 2023

Malawi competed at the 2019 African Games held from 19 to 31 August 2019 in Rabat, Morocco. Athletes representing Malawi competed in seven sports and did not win any medals.

== Archery ==
Mark Abel, Bzalani Kamtotole and Areneo David competed in archery in the men's individual recurve and the men's team recurve events.

== Athletics ==
Gift Kawale and Stern Noel Liffa competed in the men's 100 metres and men's 200 metres events. In both events they did not qualify to compete in the semifinals.

Golden Gunde competed in the men's 400 metres event. He did not qualify to compete in the semifinals.

Chauncy Master and Kefasi Chitsala competed in the men's 5000 metres and men's 10,000 metres events. Master finished in 23rd place in the 5000 metres event and in 14th place in the 10,000 metres event. Chitsala finished in 18th place in the 5000 metres and in 13th place in the 10,000 metres event.

Miriam Kachingwe and Moneyi Chingaipe competed in the women's 1500 metres event. Neither of them qualified to compete in the final. Chingaipe also competed in the women's 5000 metres event. She finished in last place.

== Chess ==
Joseph Mwale, Gerald Mphungu, Daisy Nkhoma and Tupokiwe Msukwa competed in chess.

== Judo ==
Two athletes represented Malawi in judo.

Athlete	Event	Round of 32	Round of 16	Quarterfinals	Semifinals	Repechage 1	Final / BM	
Athlete	Event	Opposition Result	Opposition Result	Opposition Result	Opposition Result	Opposition Result	Opposition Result	Rank
Harriet Bonface	Women's -48 kg	Makaba (BOT); L	did not advance					
Chikondi Samuel Kathewera	Men's -60 kg	Agbo (NGR); L	did not advance					

== Swimming ==
Filipe Miguel Escudeiro Gomes represented Malawi in swimming. He competed in the men's 50 metre freestyle, men's 100 metre freestyle and men's 50 metre butterfly events.

== Table tennis ==
Salam Issa and Floriano Junior Massah represented Malawi in table tennis. They competed in both the men's singles and men's doubles events.

In the men's singles event, Issa lost his match against Eddy Omongole, representing Uganda, and Massah lost his match against Andy Bringaud, representing Gabon. In the men's doubles event they lost their match against Mohamed Elbeialy and Ahmed Saleh, representing Egypt.

== Taekwondo ==
Three athletes competed in Taekwondo.

Athlete	Event	Round of 32	Round of 16	Quarterfinals	Semifinals	Final	
Athlete	Event	Opposition Result	Opposition Result	Opposition Result	Opposition Result	Opposition Result	Rank
Joseph Junior Phiri	Men's –68 kg	Kondo (ZIM); W 27–7	Angala (COD); L 26–35	did not advance			
Stanislaus Karlos Phiri	Men's –74 kg	—	Fofana (MLI); L 3–24	did not advance			
Vester Banda	Women's –57 kg	—	Muriu (KEN); L 2–22	did not advance			

== See also ==
- Malawi at the African Games
