= Malawi at the 2016 Summer Olympics =

- IOC code: MAW
- NOC: Olympic and Commonwealth Games Association of Malawi

in Rio de Janeiro
- Competitors: 5 in 3 sports
- Flag bearer: Kefasi Chitsala
- Medals: Gold 0 Silver 0 Bronze 0 Total 0

Summer Olympics appearances (overview)
- 1972; 1976–1980; 1984; 1988; 1992; 1996; 2000; 2004; 2008; 2012; 2016; 2020; 2024

Other related appearances
- Rhodesia (1960)

Malawi competed at the 2016 Summer Olympics in Rio de Janeiro, Brazil, from 5 to 21 August 2016. This was the nation's tenth appearance at the Summer Olympics. Malawi did not attend the 1976 Summer Olympics in Montreal and the 1980 Summer Olympics in Moscow, because of its support to the African and United States-led boycott.

Olympic and Commonwealth Games Association of Malawi selected a squad of five athletes, three men and two women, to compete only in track and field, swimming, and archery (the nation's Olympic debut in Rio de Janeiro) at the Games; all of them received their spots through wild card entries or Tripartite Commission invitations, without having qualified. Long-distance runner Kefasi Chitsala acted as Malawi's flag bearer in the opening ceremony. Malawi, however, has yet to win its first Olympic medal.

== Archery ==
Malawi has received an invitation from the Tripartite Commission to send a male archer to the Olympic tournament, signifying the nation's Olympic debut in the sport.

Athlete	Event	Ranking round		Round of 64	Round of 32	Round of 16	Quarterfinals	Semifinals	Final / BM	
Athlete	Event	Score	Seed	Opposition Score	Opposition Score	Opposition Score	Opposition Score	Opposition Score	Opposition Score	Rank
Areneo David	Men's individual	603	62	Pasqualucci (ITA); L 0–6	did not advance					

== Athletics (track and field) ==
Malawi has received two universality slots from IAAF to send two athletes (one male and one female) to the Olympics.

Key

- Note–Ranks given for track events are within the athlete's heat only
- Q = Qualified for the next round
- q = Qualified for the next round as a fastest loser or, in field events, by position without achieving the qualifying target
- NR = National record
- N/A = Round not applicable for the event
- Bye = Athlete not required to compete in round

Athlete	Event	Heat		Final	
Athlete	Event	Result	Rank	Result	Rank
Kefasi Chitsala	Men's 5000 m	14:52.89	23	did not advance	
Tereza Master	Women's marathon	—		2:48:34	98

== Swimming ==
Malawi has received a Universality invitation from FINA to send two swimmers (one male and one female) to the Olympics.

Athlete	Event	Heat		Semifinal		Final	
Athlete	Event	Time	Rank	Time	Rank	Time	Rank
Brave Lifa	Men's 50 m freestyle	28.54	83	did not advance			
Ammara Pinto	Women's 50 m freestyle	30.32	71	did not advance			
