= Malawi at the 2012 Summer Olympics =

- IOC code: MAW
- NOC: Olympic and Commonwealth Games Association of Malawi

in London
- Competitors: 3 in 2 sports
- Flag bearer: Mike Tebulo
- Medals: Gold 0 Silver 0 Bronze 0 Total 0

Summer Olympics appearances (overview)
- 1972; 1976–1980; 1984; 1988; 1992; 1996; 2000; 2004; 2008; 2012; 2016; 2020; 2024

Other related appearances
- Rhodesia (1960)

Malawi competed at the 2012 Summer Olympics in London, which was held from 27 July to 12 August 2012. The country's participation at London marked its ninth appearance in the Summer Olympics since its début at the 1972 Summer Olympics. The delegation included two track and field athletes; Mike Tebulo and Ambwene Simukonda, and one swimmer; Joyce Tafatatha. Tebulo and Simukonda qualified through wildcard places for their respective events. Tebulo was selected as the flag bearer for the opening and closing ceremonies. Tebulo finished 44th in the men's marathon, while Simukonda did not advance beyond the first round of the women's 400 metres. Tafatatha won her heat in the women's 50 metre freestyle but her time was not fast enough to allow her to progress into the semi-finals of the event.

== Background ==
Malawi participated in nine Summer Olympic Games between its début at the 1972 Summer Olympics in Munich, West Germany and the 2012 Summer Olympics in London, England. The only occasions in that period which they did not attend was at the 1976 Summer Olympics in Montreal and the 1980 Summer Olympics in the Soviet Union, the former because of a boycott relating to the New Zealand national rugby union team touring South Africa, and the latter because the country joined the United States-led boycott over the 1979 invasion of Afghanistan during the Soviet–Afghan War. No Malawian athlete has ever won a medal at the Olympics. Malawi participated in the London Summer Olympics from 27 July to 12 August 2012.

The delegation was made up of marathon runner Mike Tebulo, sprinter Ambwene Simukonda and swimmer Joyce Tafatatha. The team was coached by Francis Munthali, John Kayange and Yona Walesi. Malawi was represented by the country's NOC treasurer Jappie Mhango and Chef De Mission Flora Mwandira. Swimmer Charlton Nyirenda withdrew after being unable to meet the International Olympic Committee preconditions for qualifying for the Olympic Games on solidarity. Tebulo was the flag bearer for both the opening and closing ceremonies. In the run up to the Games, the Malawian team were based at the University of Gloucestershire, and trained in the town of Cheltenham.

== Athletics ==
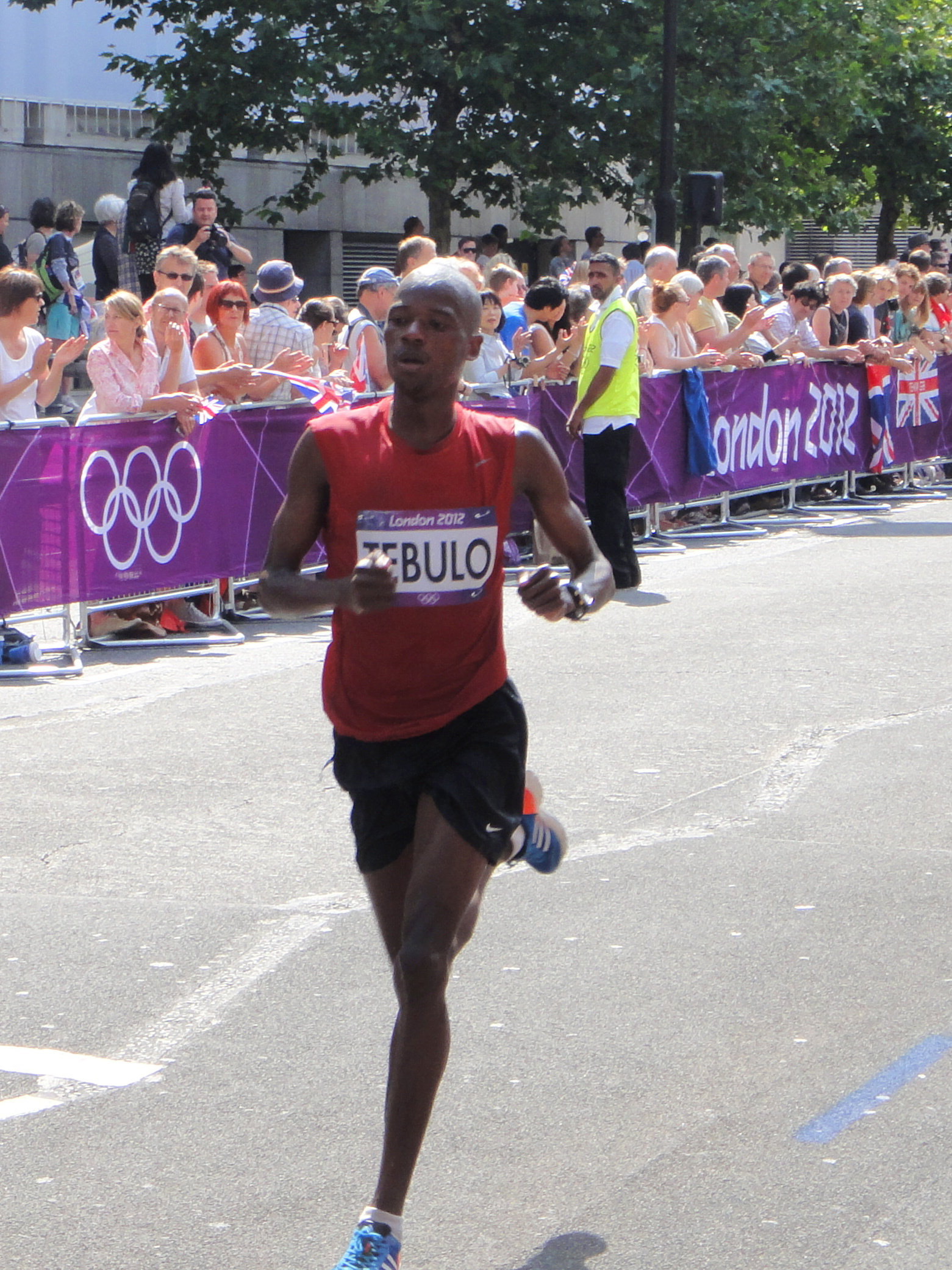
Mike Tebulo competing in the men's marathon

The 2012 Summer Games marked Mike Tebulo's Olympic début. He was the only male to represent Malawi at the Games and he was 27 years old at the time. Tebulo qualified for the Olympics via a wildcard, as his best time of two hours, 18 minutes and 31 seconds set at the 2010 Commonwealth Games in New Delhi, was 31 seconds slower than the "B" qualifying standard, for his event, the men's marathon. He competed in the men's marathon on 12 August, finishing 44th out of 85th finishers, (Note: Twenty athletes did not finish.) with a time of 2 hours, 19 minutes and 11 seconds. As of 2016, the time is his personal best.

At the age of 28, Ambwene Simukonda made her first appearance at the Olympics, and was the oldest competitor to be selected by the Malawi team. She qualified for the Games via a wildcard, as her best time of 54.32 seconds, was 2.12 seconds slower than the "B" qualifying standard, for her event, the women's 400 metres. Simukonda participated in the event's first round in its fifth heat on 3 August, finishing fifth out of six competitors, with a time of 54:20 seconds, achieving a new Malawian national record. Overall Simukonda finished 37th out of 45 athletes, (Note: Two competitors did not finish, one was disqualified and one did not start.) and was eliminated because she was 1.97 seconds slower than the slowest competitor in her heat who advanced to the semi-finals.

Key

- Note–Ranks given for track events are within the athlete's heat only
- Q = Qualified for the next round
- q = Qualified for the next round as a fastest loser or, in field events, by position without achieving the qualifying target
- NR = National record

Men

Athlete	Event	Final	
Athlete	Event	Result	Rank
Mike Tebulo	Marathon	2:19:11	44

Women

Athlete	Event	Heat		Semifinal		Final	
Athlete	Event	Result	Rank	Result	Rank	Result	Rank
Ambwene Simukonda	400 m	54.20 NR	5	Did not advance			

== Swimming ==
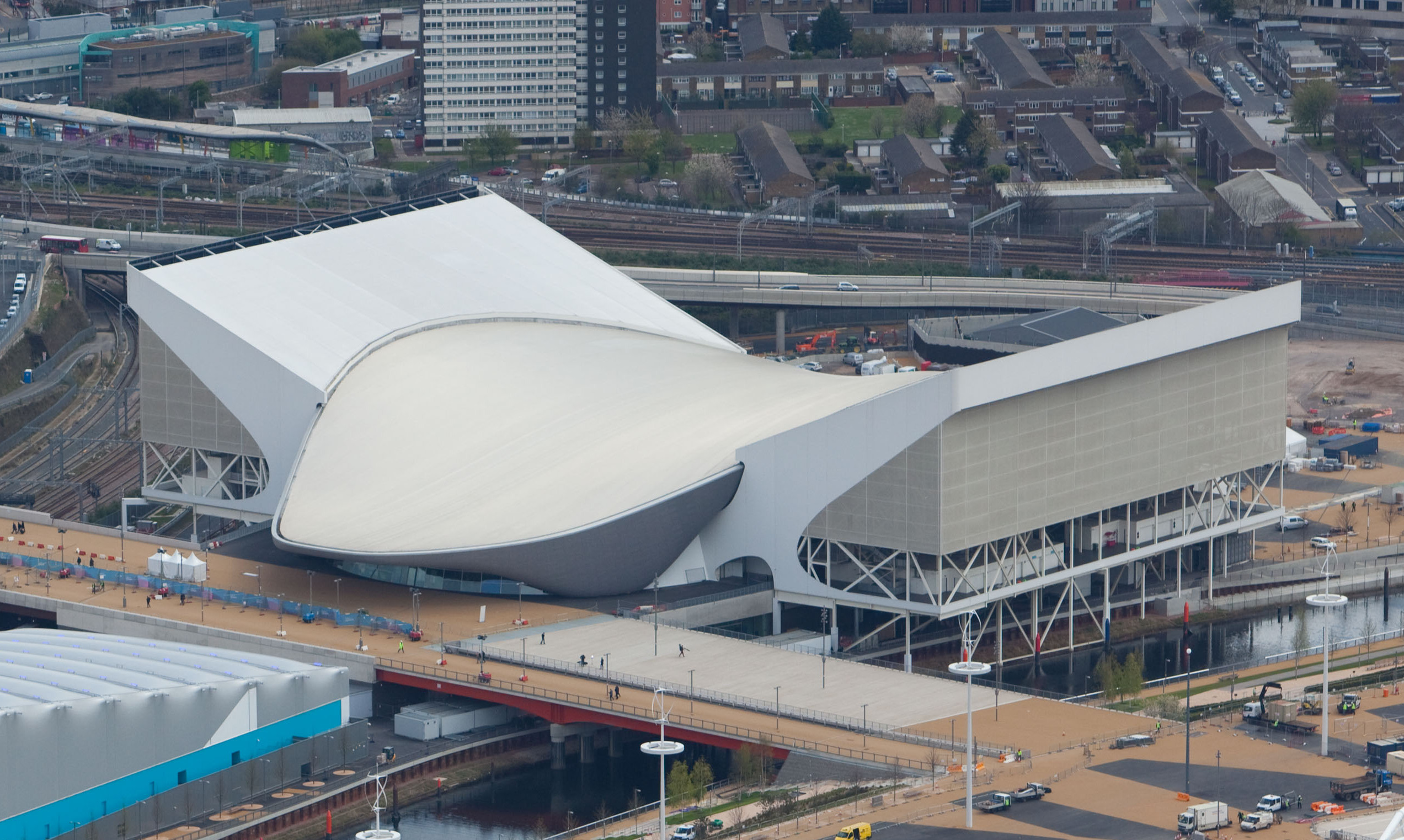
The London Aquatics Centre where Tafatatha competed in the women's 50 metre freestyle event.

Competing at her first Olympic Games, Joyce Tafatatha was the youngest athlete in Malawi's Olympic history at the age of 14. She, along with Aurélie Fanchette of the Seychelles, were two of the youngest competitors at the London Olympic Games, Tafataha said that despite being nervous, she was looking forward to competing at the Olympics and stated: "It's going to be so exciting". FINA awarded her a universality place because her fastest time did not meet the "B" qualifying standard. Tafataha was drawn in the fourth heat of the women's 50 metres freestyle which was held on 3 August, finishing first out of seven swimmers, with a time of 27.74 seconds. She recorded a new personal best two seconds faster than her previous fastest, and was the first Malawian athlete to win a heat in the women's 50 metre freestyle. She finished 46th out of 73 swimmers overall, (Note: One swimmer, Eszter Dara, did not start.) and although she won, she did not progress to the semi-finals, because her time was 2.46 seconds slower than the slowest athlete who advanced to the later stages.

Women

Athlete	Event	Heat		Semifinal		Final	
Athlete	Event	Time	Rank	Time	Rank	Time	Rank
Joyce Tafatatha	50 m freestyle	27.74	46	Did not advance			

== See also ==
- Malawi at the 2012 Summer Paralympics
