= Malawi at the 2024 Summer Olympics =

- Flag of Malawi
- IOC code: MAW
- NOC: Olympic and Commonwealth Games Association of Malawi

in Paris, France 26 July 2024 – 11 August 2024
- Competitors: 3 (1 man and 2 women) in 2 sports
- Flag bearers: Filipe Gomes & Asimenye Simwaka
- Medals: Gold 0 Silver 0 Bronze 0 Total 0

Summer Olympics appearances (overview)
- 1972; 1976–1980; 1984; 1988; 1992; 1996; 2000; 2004; 2008; 2012; 2016; 2020; 2024

Other related appearances
- Rhodesia (1960)

Malawi competed at the 2024 Summer Olympics in Paris, France from 26 July to 11 August 2024. This marked Malawi's eleventh appearance at the Summer Olympics since its debut in 1972. Malawi did not attend the 1976 Summer Olympics in Montreal or the 1980 Summer Olympics in Moscow, because of its support for the African- and United States-led boycotts, respectively.

== Competitors ==
The following is the list of number of competitors in the Games.

| Sport | Men | Women | Total |
|---|---|---|---|
| Athletics | 0 | 1 | 1 |
| Swimming | 1 | 1 | 2 |
| Total | 1 | 2 | 3 |

== Athletics ==
Malawi sent one sprinter to compete at the 2024 Summer Olympics.

Key

- Note–Ranks given for track events are within the athlete's heat only
- Q = Qualified for the next round
- q = Qualified for the next round as a fastest loser or, in field events, by position without achieving the qualifying target
- NR = National record
- N/A = Round not applicable for the event
- Bye = Athlete not required to compete in round

Track events

| Athlete | Event | Preliminary | | Heat | | Semifinal | | Final | |
| Athlete | Event | Result | Rank | Result | Rank | Result | Rank | Result | Rank |
|---|---|---|---|---|---|---|---|---|---|
| Asimenye Simwaka | Women's 100 m | 11.78 | 2 Q | 11.91 | 8 | Did not advance | | | |

== Swimming ==
Malawi received two universality quota spots from FINA (one man and one woman).

| Athlete | Event | Heat | | Semifinal | | Final | |
| Athlete | Event | Time | Rank | Time | Rank | Time | Rank |
|---|---|---|---|---|---|---|---|
| Filipe Gomes | Men's 50 m freestyle | 24.11 | 49 | Did not advance | | | |
| Tayamika Chang'anamuno | Women's 50 m freestyle | 29.32 | 55 | Did not advance | | | |

Qualifiers for the latter rounds (Q) of all events were decided on a time only basis, therefore positions shown are overall results versus competitors in all heats.
