= Malawi at the 1972 Summer Olympics =

- IOC code: MAW
- NOC: Olympic and Commonwealth Games Association of Malawi

in Munich
- Competitors: 16 (13 men, 3 women) in 3 sports
- Flag bearer: Martin Matupi
- Medals: Gold 0 Silver 0 Bronze 0 Total 0

Summer Olympics appearances (overview)
- 1972; 1976–1980; 1984; 1988; 1992; 1996; 2000; 2004; 2008; 2012; 2016; 2020; 2024

Other related appearances
- Rhodesia (1960)

Malawi competed in the Olympic Games for the first time at the 1972 Summer Olympics in Munich, West Germany. 16 competitors, 13 men and 3 women, took part in 17 events in 3 sports.

== Competitors ==
Sixteen athletes competed for Malawi at the 1972 Summer Olympics including 13 men and 3 women. They took part in 17 events in 3 sports as follows:

Sport	Men	Women	Total
Athletics	8	3	11
Boxing	3	0	3
Cycling	2	0	2
Total	13	3	16

== Athletics ==
Men's 100 metres

- Moustafa Matola

- First Heat – 11.31s (→ did not advance, 84th place)

Men's 800 metres

- Harry Nkopeka

- Heat – 1:57.7 (→ did not advance, 55th place)

Men's 1500 metres

- Harry Nkopeka

- Heat – 4:00.9 (→ did not advance, 61st place)

Men's High Jump

- Daniel Mkandawire

- Qualification Round – 1.90m (→ did not advance, 38th place out of 43)

Men's Decathlon

- Wilfred Ngwenya-Mwalwanda

- 6,154 pts

Women's 200 metres

- Mabel Saeluzika

- Heat – 28.29s (→ did not advance)

Women's 400 metres

- Emesia Chizunga

- Heat – 58.86s (→ did not advance)

== Boxing ==
Men

Athlete	Event	1 Round	2 Round	3 Round	Quarterfinals	Semifinals	Final	
Athlete	Event	Opposition Result	Opposition Result	Opposition Result	Opposition Result	Opposition Result	Opposition Result	Rank
Shekie Kongo	Ligthflyweight	BYE	Chanyalew Haile (ETH); L TKO-3	did not advance				
Jungle Thangata	Featherweight	BYE	Antonio Rubio (ESP); L TKO-3	did not advance				
Tatu Chionga	Lightweight	BYE	Karel Kaspar (TCH); L 0–5	did not advance				

== Cycling ==
Two cyclists represented Malawi in 1972.

Individual road race

- Grimon Langson – did not finish (→ no ranking)
- Raphael Kazembe – did not finish (→ no ranking)

== Selected biographies of the athletes ==
=== Mabel Saeluzika (Athletics, women's 200 m) ===
Saeluzika (born 1 May 1956) competed in the women's 200 metres at the 1972 Summer Olympics. She was seeded in the second 200 metres heat. She ran 28.29 seconds to place 6th in the heat and, as a result, did not advance to the final. At 16 years and 126 days old, Saeluzika was the 8th-youngest person to ever compete in athletics at the Olympics (as of 2016).
