= Malawi at the 2000 Summer Olympics =

- IOC code: MAW
- NOC: Olympic and Commonwealth Games Association of Malawi

in Sydney
- Competitors: 2 in 1 sport
- Flag bearer: Francis Munthali
- Medals: Gold 0 Silver 0 Bronze 0 Total 0

Summer Olympics appearances (overview)
- 1972; 1976–1980; 1984; 1988; 1992; 1996; 2000; 2004; 2008; 2012; 2016; 2020; 2024; 2028

Other related appearances
- Rhodesia (1960)

Malawi competed at the 2000 Summer Olympics in Sydney, Australia. The country's participation marked its sixth appearance at the Summer Olympics since its debut at the 1972 Games. The delegation included two track and field athletes: Francis Munthali in the men's 1500 metres and Catherine Chikwakwa in the women's 5000 metres. Both athletes participated at the Games through wild card places since they did not meet the required standards to qualify. Neither athletes progressed past their heats.

== Background ==
Malawi participated in six Summer Olympic games between its début at the 1972 Summer Olympics in Munich, West Germany and the 2000 Summer Olympics in Sydney, Australia. The only occasions in that period which they did not attend was at the 1976 Summer Olympics in Montreal and the 1980 Summer Olympics in the Soviet Union, the former because of a boycott relating to the New Zealand national rugby union team touring South Africa, and the latter because the country joined the United States-led boycott over the 1979 invasion of Afghanistan during the Soviet–Afghan War. The highest number of athletes sent by Malawi to a summer games is 16 to the 1972 Games and the 1988 Olympics in Seoul, South Korea.

The Malawian team at the 2000 Games consisted of two athletes, one male and one female. Prior to the games, Malawian long-distance runner Francis Munthali participated in the Sydney 2000 Olympic Scholarship programme. A total of 472 participants in the programme went on to compete in the Games. This was the second time that Munthali had competed at the Olympics, having previously competed in the 800 metres at the 1992 Summer Olympics in Barcelona, Spain. Catherine Chikwakwa was 15 years old when she was selected for Malawi at the 2000 Olympics.

Neither athlete recorded times fast enough to automatically qualify; the only previous time any Malawian athlete had done so was at the 1972 Games.

== Competitors ==
The following is the list of number of competitors in the Games.

Sport	Men	Women	Total
Athletics	1	1	2
Total	1	1	2

== Athletics ==
The country's sole female athlete at the 2000 Games was Catherine Chikwakwa, who competed in the 5000 metres. She competed on 22 September in the third heat of the first round, and completed the run in 16 minutes and 39.82 seconds, finishing in 15th place out of the 17 athletes. She was faster than Swaziland's Priscilla Mamba (17 minutes and 30.04 seconds) and Baatarkhüügiin Battsetseg of Mongolia (18 minutes and 22.98 seconds). The top four athletes in each heat automatically qualified for the final, while the next two finished fast enough to receive spots based on their times. Chikwakwa's therefore failed to qualify past the first round.

Malawi was represented by one male athlete at the 2000 Games in athletics – Francis Munthali in the 1500 metres. He competed in the first heat of the first round on 25 September. Munthali finished in last place of the 13 athletes with a time of three minutes and 46.34 seconds, directly behind Croatia's Branko Zorko (three minutes and 46.16 seconds). Only the top six athletes in the heat qualified for the semi-finals, as well as seventh placed Julius Achon of Uganda who qualified as one of the fastest runners up from all the heats. As such, Munthali's Olympic competition ended after that single run.

Key

- Note–Ranks given for track events are within the athlete's heat only
- N/A = Round not applicable for the event

Track and road events

Athlete	Event	Heat		Semifinal		Final	
Athlete	Event	Result	Rank	Result	Rank	Result	Rank
Catherine Chikwakwa	Women's 5000 metres	16:39.82	46	N/A		did not advance	
Francis Munthali	Men's 1500 metres	03:46.34	13	did not advance			
