= Athletics at the 2000 Summer Olympics – Women's 5000 metres =

Women's 5000 metres at the Games of the XXVII Olympiad
- Venue: ANZ Stadium
- Date: 22 September 2000 (heats); 25 September 2000 (final)
- Competitors: 49 from 31 nations
- Winning time: 14:40.79 OR

Medalists
1st place, gold medalist(s)		Gabriela Szabo; Romania
2nd place, silver medalist(s)		Sonia O'Sullivan; Ireland
3rd place, bronze medalist(s)		Gete Wami; Ethiopia

The Women's 5000 metres at the 2000 Summer Olympics as part of the athletics programme was held at Stadium Australia on Friday 22 September, and Sunday 25 September 2000. The top four runners in each of the initial three heats automatically qualified for the final. The next three fastest runners from across the heats also qualified. There were a total number of 50 participating athletes.

The winning margin was 0.23 seconds which as of 2025 is the only time the women's 5,000 metres has been won by less than 0.4 seconds at the Olympics.

== Records ==
World Record	14:28.09	Jiang Bo	China	Shanghai, China	23 October 1997
Olympic Record	14:59.88	Junxia Wang	China	Atlanta, Georgia, United States	28 July 1996

== Medals ==
Gold:	Silver:	Bronze:
Gabriela Szabo, Romania	Sonia O'Sullivan, Ireland	Gete Wami, Ethiopia

== Results ==
All times shown are in seconds.

- Q denotes qualification by place in heat.
- q denotes qualification by overall place.
- DNS denotes did not start.
- DNF denotes did not finish.
- DQ denotes disqualification.
- NR denotes national record.
- OR denotes Olympic record.
- WR denotes world record.
- PB denotes personal best.
- SB denotes season best.

=== Heats ===
Heat 1 of 3 Date: Friday 22 September 2000
Place		Athlete	Nation	Lane	Time	Qual.	Record
Heat	Overall	Athlete	Nation	Lane	Time	Qual.	Record
1	1	Sonia O'Sullivan	Ireland	12	15:07.91	Q	SB
2	4	Jo Pavey	Great Britain	6	15:08.82	Q	PB
3	5T	Gete Wami	Ethiopia	2	15:08.92	Q	
4	7	Lydia Cheromei	Kenya	8	15:09.32	Q	
5	9	Daniela Yordanova	Bulgaria	3	15:10.08	q	NR
6	17	Benita Willis	Australia	13	15:21:37		PB
7	19	Elva Dryer	United States	9	15:23.99		
8	23	Rosemary Ryan	Ireland	17	15:33.05		
9	24	Nora Leticia Rocha	Mexico	5	15:38.72		
10	33	Michiko Shimizu	Japan	16	15:48.20		
11	36	Dulce María Rodriguez	Mexico	15	15:54.17		
12	39	Yamna Belkacem	France	11	16:08.49		
13	40	Helena Javornik	Slovenia	7	16:09.60		
14	42	Elisa Cobañea	Argentina	14	16:16.58		
15	44	Nebiat Habtemariam	Eritrea	4	16:30.41		NR
16	47	Maysa Hussain Matrood	Iraq	1	17:17.58		
		Restituta Joseph	Tanzania	10	DNS		

Heat 2 of 3 Date: Friday 22 September 2000
Place		Athlete	Nation	Lane	Time	Qual.	Record
Heat	Overall	Athlete	Nation	Lane	Time	Qual.	Record
1	12	Rose Cheruiyot	Kenya	7	15:13.18	Q	
2	13	Ayelech Worku	Ethiopia	4	15:13.26	Q	
3	14	Olga Yegorova	Russia	10	15:14.34	Q	
4	15	Irina Mikitenko	Germany	5	15:14.76	Q	
5	16	Susanne Pumper	Austria	2	15:16.66		
6	20	Roberta Brunet	Italy	16	15:27:32		
7	21	Amy Rudolph	United States	12	15:28.91		
8	25	Sonja Stolic	FR Yugoslavia	13	15:38.96		
9	26	Megumi Tanaka	Japan	15	15:39.83		
10	27	Marta Dominguez	Spain	3	15:45.07		
11	30	Hrisostomia Iakovou	Greece	6	15:46.48		
12	31	Samukeliso Moyo	Zimbabwe	14	15:47.76		
13	37	Zhor El Kamch	Morocco	8	16:02.50		
14	38	Anne Cross	Australia	1	16:07.18		
15	41	Andrea Whitcombe	Great Britain	9	16:15.82		
16	43	Maggie Chan Man Yee	Hong Kong	11	16:20.43		

Heat 3 of 3 Date: Friday 22 September 2000
Place		Athlete	Nation	Lane	Time	Qual.	Record
Heat	Overall	Athlete	Nation	Lane	Time	Qual.	Record
1	2	Gabriela Szabo	Romania	14	15:08.36	Q	
2	3	Worknesh Kidane	Ethiopia	4	15:08.62	Q	
3	5T	Tatyana Tomashova	Russia	15	15:08.92	Q	
4	8	Jeļena Čelnova-Prokopčuka	Latvia	11	15:09.45	Q	
5	10	Vivian Cheruiyot	Kenya	9	15:11.11	q	PB
6	11	Olivera Jevtić	FR Yugoslavia	17	15:11:25	q	NR
7	18	Yoshiko Ichikawa	Japan	10	15:23.41		SB
8	22	Beatriz Santiago	Spain	3	15:31.94		
9	28	Kate Anderson-Richardson	Australia	1	15:45.34		
10	29	Inga Juodeškienė	Lithuania	12	15:46.37		
11	32	Anne Marie Letko	United States	6	15:47.78		
12	34	Ebru Kavaklioglu	Turkey	16	15:49.15		
13	35	Breda Dennehy-Willis	Ireland	8	15:49.58		
14	45	Diane Nukuri	Burundi	2	16:38.30		PB
15	46	Catherine Chikwakwa	Malawi	5	16:39.82		PB
16	48	Priscilla Mamba	Swaziland	7	17:30.04		NR
17	49	Baatarkhüügiin Battsetseg	Mongolia	13	18:22.98		SB

Overall Results Semi-Finals

Semi-Finals Overall Results
Place	Athlete	Nation	Heat	Lane	Place	Time	Qual.	Record
1	Sonia O'Sullivan	Ireland	1	12	1	15:07.91	Q	SB
2	Gabriela Szabo	Romania	3	14	1	15:08.36	Q	
3	Worknesh Kidane	Ethiopia	3	4	2	15:08.62	Q	
4	Jo Pavey	Great Britain	1	6	2	15:08.82	Q	PB
5	Tatyana Tomashova	Russia	3	15	3	15:08.92	Q	
5	Gete Wami	Ethiopia	1	2	3	15:08.92	Q	
7	Lydia Cheromei	Kenya	1	8	4	15:09.32	Q	
8	Jeļena Čelnova-Prokopčuka	Latvia	3	11	4	15:09.45	Q	
9	Daniela Yordanova	Bulgaria	1	3	5	15:10.08	q	NR
10	Vivian Cheruiyot	Kenya	3	9	5	15:11.11	q	PB
11	Olivera Jevtić	FR Yugoslavia	3	17	6	15:11.25	q	NR
12	Rose Cheruiyot	Kenya	2	7	1	15:13.18	Q	
13	Ayelech Worku	Ethiopia	2	4	2	15:13.26	Q	
14	Olga Yegorova	Russia	2	10	3	15:14.34	Q	
15	Irina Mikitenko	Germany	2	5	4	15:14.76	Q	
16	Susanne Pumper	Austria	2	2	5	15:16.66		
17	Benita Willis	Australia	1	13	6	15:21.37		PB
18	Yoshiko Ichikawa	Japan	3	10	7	15:23.31		SB
19	Elva Dryer	United States	1	9	7	15:23.99		
20	Roberta Brunet	Italy	2	1	6	15:27.32		
21	Amy Rudolph	United States	2	12	7	15:28.91		
22	Beatriz Santiago	Spain	3	3	8	15:31.94		
23	Rosemary Ryan	Ireland	1	17	8	15:33.05		
24	Nora Leticia Rocha	Mexico	1	5	9	15:38.72		
25	Sonja Stolic	FR Yugoslavia	2	13	8	15:38.96		
26	Megumi Tanaka	Japan	2	15	9	15:39.83		
27	Marta Dominguez	Spain	2	3	10	15:45.07		
28	Kate Anderson-Richardson	Australia	3	1	9	15:45.34		
29	Inga Juodeškienė	Lithuania	3	12	10	15:46.37		
30	Hrisostomia Iakovou	Greece	2	6	11	15:46.48		
31	Samukeliso Moyo	Zimbabwe	2	14	12	15:47.76		
32	Anne Marie Letko	United States	3	6	11	15:47.78		
33	Michiko Shimizu	Japan	1	16	10	15:48.20		
34	Ebru Kavaklioglu	Turkey	3	16	12	15:49.15		
35	Breda Dennehy-Willis	Ireland	3	8	13	15:49.58		
36	Dulce María Rodriguez	Mexico	1	15	11	15:54.17		
37	Zhor El Kamch	Morocco	2	8	13	16:02.50		
38	Anne Cross	Australia	2	1	14	16:07.18		
39	Yamna Belkacem	France	1	11	12	16:08.49		
40	Helena Javornik	Slovenia	1	7	13	16:09.60		
41	Andrea Whitcombe	Great Britain	2	9	15	16:15.82		
42	Elisa Cobañea	Argentina	1	4	14	16:16.58		
43	Maggie Chan Man Yee	Hong Kong	2	1	16	16:20.43		
44	Nebiat Habtemariam	Eritrea	1	4	15	16:30.41		NR
45	Diane Nukuri	Burundi	3	2	14	16:38.30		PB
46	Catherine Chikwakwa	Malawi	3	5	15	16:39.82		PB
47	Maysa Hussein Matrood	Iraq	1	1	16	17:17.58		
48	Priscilla Mamba	Swaziland	3	7	16	17:30.04		NR
49	Baatarkhuu Battsetseg	Mongolia	3	13	17	18:22.98		SB
	Restituta Joseph	Tanzania	1	10		DNS		

=== Final ===
Date: Monday 25 September 2000
Place	Athlete	Nation	Lane	Time	Record
1st place, gold medalist(s)	Gabriela Szabo	Romania	10	14:40.79	OR
2nd place, silver medalist(s)	Sonia O'Sullivan	Ireland	7	14:41.02	NR
3rd place, bronze medalist(s)	Gete Wami	Ethiopia	11	14:42.23	
4	Ayelech Worku	Ethiopia	14	14:42.67	
5	Irina Mikitenko	Germany	1	14:43.59	SB
6	Lydia Cheromei	Kenya	15	14:47.35	PB
7	Werknesh Kidane	Ethiopia	2	14:47.40	PB
8	Olga Yegorova	Russia	12	14:50.31	
9	Jeļena Čelnova-Prokopčuka	Latvia	6	14:55.46	
10	Daniela Yordanova	Bulgaria	5	14:56.95	NR
11	Rose Cheruiyot	Kenya	13	14:58.07	
12	Jo Pavey	Great Britain	3	14:58.27	PB
13	Tatyana Tomashova	Russia	4	15:01.28	
14	Vivian Cheruiyot	Kenya	8	15:25.67	
	Olivera Jevtić	FR Yugoslavia	9	DNF	
