= Malawi at the 1996 Summer Olympics =

- IOC code: MAW
- NOC: Olympic and Commonwealth Games Association of Malawi

in Atlanta
- Competitors: 2 in 1 sport
- Flag bearer: John Mwathiwa
- Medals: Gold 0 Silver 0 Bronze 0 Total 0

Summer Olympics appearances (overview)
- 1972; 1976–1980; 1984; 1988; 1992; 1996; 2000; 2004; 2008; 2012; 2016; 2020; 2024

Other related appearances
- Rhodesia (1960)

Malawi sent a delegation to compete at the 1996 Summer Olympics in Atlanta, United States from 19 July to 4 August 1996. This was the African nation's fifth appearance at a Summer Olympic Games. The Malawian delegation consisted of two competitors in the sport of athletics; Henry Moyo failed to advance past the first round heats of the 5,000 meters, and John Mwathiwa finished 65th in the marathon.

== Background ==
The Olympic and Commonwealth Games Association of Malawi was recognized by the International Olympic Committee on 1 January 1968. The nation first joined Olympic competition at the 1972 Summer Olympics, however, they did not compete again until the 1984 Summer Olympics. Malawi participated in an African boycott over New Zealand's participation at the 1976 Summer Olympics and joined a United States-led boycott of the 1980 Moscow Olympics over the Soviet invasion of Afghanistan. This made Atlanta Malawi's fifth appearance at a Summer Olympic Games. The 1996 Summer Olympics were held from 19 July to 4 August 1996; 10,318 athletes represented 194 National Olympic Committees.

Six athletes were to compete at Atlanta, including Henry Moyo and John Mwathiwa in the marathon, Francis Munthali in the men's 1,500 m and the 5,000 m, Chimwemwe Labana in the women's 1,500 m and the 5,000 m, and tennis players Austin Kaitano and Thompson Mtengula in the men's singles.

The country's contingent of athletes and officials were billeted before the games in Hattiesburg, Mississippi, where they were apparently adopted by the town. The town raised money to buy Moyo and Mwathiwa new sneakers and bags and sew them new uniforms, which apparently bore labels for the town's convention and visitors' centre.

In the end, there were two competitors who represented Malawi, Henry Moyo and John Mwathiwa. Mwathiwa was selected as the flag-bearer for the opening ceremony.

== Competitors ==
The following is the list of number of competitors in the Games.

Sport	Men	Women	Total
Athletics	2	0	2
Total	2	0	2

== Athletics ==
Henry Moyo was 24 years old at the time of the Atlanta Olympics, and was making his only Olympic appearance. On 31 July, he competed in the heats of the 5,000 meters, where he was drawn into heat two. He finished the heat in a time of 14 minutes and 30.53 seconds, 13th and last in his heat, and he was eliminated. The podium was swept by African athletes, with the gold medal eventually won by Vénuste Niyongabo of Burundi, the silver by Paul Bitok of Kenya, and the bronze medal was won by Khalid Boulami of Morocco.

John Mwathiwa was 29 years old at the time of these Olympics, and was making his third consecutive, and final, Olympic appearance. On 4 August, he took part in the Marathon, a race that was held without rounds or heats. He finished in 2 hours, 24 minutes, 45 seconds, which put him in 65th place among 111 athletes who finished the race. The gold medal was won in 2 hours, 12 minutes and 36 seconds by Josia Thugwane of South Africa, the silver by South Korean runner Lee Bong-ju, and the bronze was won by Kenyan Erick Wainaina.

Athletes	Events	Heat Round 1		Semifinal		Final	
Athletes	Events	Time	Rank	Time	Rank	Time	Rank
Henry Moyo	5000 metres	14:30.53	13	did not advance			
John Mwathiwa	Marathon	N/A				2:24:45	65
