= Baatarkhuu =

Bayarsaikhan is a Mongolian surname. Notable people with the surname include:

- Aduuchiin Baatarkhüü (born 1956), Mongolian wrestler
- Baatarkhuu Battsetseg (born 1976), Mongolian long-distance runner
- Enkh-Orgil Baatarkhuu (born 1988), Mongolian mixed martial artist
