= Malawi at the African Games =

- IOC code: MAW
- NOC: Malawi Olympic Committee
- Medals Ranked 50th: Gold 0 Silver 1 Bronze 4 Total 5

African Games appearances (overview)
- 1987; 1991–1995; 1999; 2003–2007; 2011; 2015; 2019; 2023

Malawi (MAW) has competed in the African Games since the second Games in 1973. Athletes from Malawi have won a total of five medals in three Games, first winning in 1987. While competing, two athletes have also broken the national record in 800 metres, firstly in the men's event in 1987 and then in the women's in 2003.

== Participation ==
Malawi's involvement in the African Games is organised by the Malawi Olympic Committee. The country was first represented by Matthews Kambale at the 1973 Games. However, it was not until 1987 that the country received its first medal, a bronze in football. Football is the most popular sport in Malawi. Despite this, it has been the only time that the national team has won a medal at the games.

At the same Games, Kenneth Dzekedzeke set a national record of 1 minute 49 seconds in the men's 800 metres. In 2003, Gertrude Banda repeated the achievement by breaking the national record in women's event. However, development of these individual achievements has been hampered by a lack of infrastructure and capacity in the country and, particularly, a lack of political and corporate financial support. This led to the country being barred from competing in the Games in both 2011 and 2015 due to debt with the Supreme Council of Sports in Africa (SCSA). More recently, Malawi has invested more in international sport and was commended by the organisers of the Games for their structures. The country returned in 2019, sending athletes to compete in archery, athletics, judo, swimming, table tennis and taekwondo.

== Medal tables ==
=== Medals by Games ===
Below is a table representing all Malawian medals won at the Games. The country ranks 50th in the overall medal table. The highest ranking in an individual Games was 21st in 1987.

Games	Athletes	Gold	Silver	Bronze	Total	Rank
1987 Nairobi		0	0	1	1	21st
1999 Johannesburg		0	0	1	1	34th
2007 Algiers		0	1	2	3	29th
2019 Rabat		0	0	0	0	
Total		0	1	4	5	

== See also ==
- Malawi at the Olympics
- Malawi at the Paralympics
- Sport in Malawi
