= Malawi at the 1984 Summer Olympics =

- IOC code: MAW
- NOC: Olympic and Commonwealth Games Association of Malawi

in Los Angeles
- Competitors: 15 (15 men) in 3 sports
- Flag bearer: Fletcher Kapito
- Medals: Gold 0 Silver 0 Bronze 0 Total 0

Summer Olympics appearances (overview)
- 1972; 1976–1980; 1984; 1988; 1992; 1996; 2000; 2004; 2008; 2012; 2016; 2020; 2024

Other related appearances
- Rhodesia (1960)

Malawi competed at the 1984 Summer Olympics in Los Angeles, California, United States. The nation returned to the Olympic Games after boycotting both the 1976 and 1980 Games. Fifteen competitors, all men, took part in sixteen events in three sports.

== Athletics ==
Men's 400 metres

- Agripa Mwausegha

- Heat – 49.12 (→ did not advance)

Men's 5,000 metres

- George Mambosasa

- Heat – 14:48.08 (→ did not advance)

Men's 10,000 metres

- Matthews Kambale

- Qualifying Heat – 30:47.73 (→ did not advance, 38th place out of 41)

Men's Marathon

- George Mambosasa – 2:46:14 (→ 74th place)
- Matthews Kambale – did not finish (→ no ranking)

== Boxing ==
- Ali Faki - men's featherweight

== Cycling ==
Four cyclists represented Malawi in 1984.

Individual road race

- Dyton Chimwaza – did not finish (→ no ranking)
- Daniel Kaswanga – did not finish (→ no ranking)
- George Nayeja – did not finish (→ no ranking)
- Amadu Yusufu – did not finish (→ no ranking)

Team time trial

- Dyton Chimwaza
- Daniel Kaswanga
- George Nayeja
- Amadu Yusufu
