= Malawi at the 2008 Summer Olympics =

- IOC code: MAW
- NOC: Olympic and Commonwealth Games Association of Malawi

in Beijing
- Competitors: 4 in 2 sports
- Flag bearer: Charlton Nyirenda
- Medals: Gold 0 Silver 0 Bronze 0 Total 0

Summer Olympics appearances (overview)
- 1972; 1976–1980; 1984; 1988; 1992; 1996; 2000; 2004; 2008; 2012; 2016; 2020; 2024

Other related appearances
- Rhodesia (1960)

Malawi was represented at the 2008 Summer Olympics in Beijing, China by the Olympic and Commonwealth Games Association of Malawi.

In total, four athletes including two men and two women represented Malawi in two different sports including athletics and swimming.

== Competitors ==
In total, four athletes represented Malawi at the 2008 Summer Olympics in Beijing, China across two different sports.

Sport	Men	Women	Total
Athletics	1	1	2
Swimming	1	1	2
Total	2	2	4

== Athletics ==
In total, two Malawian athletes participated in the athletics events – Lucia Chandamale in the women's 5,000 m and Chauncy Master in the men's 1,500 m.

The athletics events took place at the Beijing National Stadium in Chaoyang, Beijing from 15 to 24 August 2008.

The heats for the men's 1,500 m took place on 15 August 2008. Master finished ninth in his heat in a time of three minutes 44.96 seconds and he did not advance to the semi-finals.

Athlete	Event	Heat		Semifinal		Final	
Athlete	Event	Result	Rank	Result	Rank	Result	Rank
Chauncy Master	1,500 m	3:44.96	10	Did not advance			

The heats for the women's 5,000 m took place on 19 August 2008. Chandamale finished 15th in her heat in a time of 16 minutes 44.09 seconds and he did not advance to the final.

Athlete	Event	Heat		Final	
Athlete	Event	Result	Rank	Result	Rank
Lucia Chandamale	5,000 m	16:44.09	15	Did not advance	

== Swimming ==
In total, two Malawian athletes participated in the swimming events – Charlton Nyirenda in the men's 50 m freestyle and Zahra Pinto in the women's 50 m freestyle.

The swimming events took place at the Water Cube in Chaoyang, Beijing from 9 to 17 August 2008.

The heats for the men's 50 m freestyle took place on 14 August 2008. Nyirenda finished first in his heat in a time of 27.46 seconds which was ultimately not fast enough to advance to the semi-finals.

Athlete	Event	Heat		Semifinal		Final	
Athlete	Event	Time	Rank	Time	Rank	Time	Rank
Charlton Nyirenda	50 m freestyle	27.46	80	Did not advance			

The heats for the women's 50 m freestyle took place on 15 August 2008. Pinto finished third in her heat in a time of 32.53 seconds which was ultimately not fast enough to advance to the semi-finals.

Athlete	Event	Heat		Semifinal		Final	
Athlete	Event	Time	Rank	Time	Rank	Time	Rank
Zahra Pinto	50 m freestyle	32.53	82	Did not advance			
