= 1995 World Championships in Athletics – Men's marathon =

The Men's Marathon at the 1995 World Championships in Gothenburg, Sweden was held on Saturday August 12, 1995.

== Medalists ==
Gold	Martín Fiz; Spain (ESP)
Silver	Dionicio Cerón; Mexico (MEX)
Bronze	Luíz Antônio dos Santos; Brazil (BRA)

== Abbreviations ==
- All times shown are in hours:minutes:seconds

DNS	did not start
NM	no mark
WR	world record
WL	world leading
AR	area record
NR	national record
PB	personal best
SB	season best

== Records ==
Standing records prior to the 1995 World Athletics Championships
World Record	Belayneh Dinsamo (ETH)	2:06:50	April 17, 1988	Rotterdam, Netherlands
Event Record	Robert de Castella (AUS)	2:10:03	August 14, 1983	Helsinki, Finland
Season Best	Dionicio Cerón (MEX)	2:08:30	April 2, 1995	London, United Kingdom

== Final ranking ==
Rank	Athlete	Time	Note
1st place, gold medalist(s)	Martín Fiz (ESP)	2:11:41	
2nd place, silver medalist(s)	Dionicio Cerón (MEX)	2:12:13	
3rd place, bronze medalist(s)	Luíz Antônio dos Santos (BRA)	2:12:49	
4	Peter Whitehead (GBR)	2:14:08	
5	Alberto Juzdado (ESP)	2:15:29	
6	Diego García (ESP)	2:15:34	
7	Richard Nerurkar (GBR)	2:15:47	
8	Steve Moneghetti (AUS)	2:16:13	
9	Andrés Espinosa (MEX)	2:16:44	
10	Steve Plasencia (USA)	2:16:56	
11	Bruce Deacon (CAN)	2:16:58	
12	Yuji Nakamura (JPN)	2:17:30	
13	Oleg Strizhakov (RUS)	2:17:50	
14	Konrad Dobler (GER)	2:18:09	
15	Isidro Rico (MEX)	2:18:29	
16	Ikaji Salum (TAN)	2:18:39	
17	Daisuke Tokunaga (JPN)	2:19:53	
18	Erick Wainaina (KEN)	2:19:53	
19	Terje Ness (NOR)	2:20:06	
20	Abdelillah Zerdal (MAR)	2:20:10	
21	Ed Eyestone (USA)	2:20:17	
22	Lee Bong-ju (KOR)	2:20:31	
23	John Andrews (AUS)	2:20:32	
24	Tahar Mansouri (TUN)	2:20:44	
25	Hussein Ahmed Salah (DJI)	2:20:50	
26	Elphas Ginindza (SWZ)	2:21:01	
27	Michael Mukoma (KEN)	2:21:08	
28	Joseph Tjitunga (NAM)	2:21:57	
29	Tumo Turbo (ETH)	2:22:01	
30	Harri Hänninen (FIN)	2:22:43	
31	Omar Abdillahi (DJI)	2:23:26	
32	Martin Ndivheni (RSA)	2:23:42	
33	Luca Barzaghi (ITA)	2:23:51	
34	John Mwathiwa (MWI)	2:24:01	
35	Roman Kejžar (SLO)	2:24:10	
36	Isaac Tshabalala (RSA)	2:24:42	
37	Stephen Langat (KEN)	2:25:49	
38	Hsu Gi-sheng (TPE)	2:25:55	
39	Dominique Chauvelier (FRA)	2:27:30	
40	Nazirdin Akylbekov (KGZ)	2:27:44	
41	Toshiaki Kurabayashi (JPN)	2:28:57	
42	William Aguirre (NCA)	2:29:54	
43	Juma Ikangaa (TAN)	2:30:53	
44	Eduard Tukhbatullin (RUS)	2:31:19	
45	Matthews Temane (RSA)	2:31:24	
46	Idris Ibrahim (SWE)	2:31:31	
47	Abebe Mekonnen (ETH)	2:32:35	
48	Mothusi Tsiana (BOT)	2:33:03	
49	Pavel Loskutov (EST)	2:33:42	
50	Jean-Marie Gehin (FRA)	2:34:10	
51	Mimoun Lamhajar (MAR)	2:35:17	
52	Sean Quilty (AUS)	2:37:01	
53	Islam Dugum (BIH)	2:38:37	
DID NOT FINISH (DNF)
—	Paul Pilkington (USA)	DNF	
—	Peter Maher (CAN)	DNF	
—	Paul Kuete (CMR)	DNF	
—	Abdelillah Sbaiti (MAR)	DNF	
—	Pamenos Ballantyne (VIN)	DNF	
—	Boay Akonay (TAN)	DNF	
—	Mark Hudspith (GBR)	DNF	
—	Antonio Vicente Neto (BRA)	DNF	
—	Laurentiu Staicu (ROM)	DNF	
—	Rainer Wachenbrunner (GER)	DNF	
—	Sid-Ali Sakhri (ALG)	DNF	
—	Karel David (CZE)	DNF	
—	Asaf Bimro (ISR)	DNF	
—	Åke Eriksson (SWE)	DNF	
—	Luigi Di Lello (ITA)	DNF	
—	Joaquim Silva (POR)	DNF	
—	Aleksandr Vychuzhanin (RUS)	DNF	
—	Yayeh Aden (DJI)	DNF	
—	Valdenor dos Santos (BRA)	DNF	
—	Joaquim Pinheiro (POR)	DNF	
—	Poulo Makhoahle (LES)	DNF	
—	Kim Yong-Bok (KOR)	DNF	
—	Borislav Dević (YUG)	DNF	
—	Tena Negere (ETH)	DNF	
—	Kent Jensen (DEN)	DNF	

== See also ==
- 1995 Marathon Year Ranking
- Men's Olympic Marathon (1996)

== Bibliography ==
- Results
- IAAF
