= Malawi at the 1992 Summer Olympics =

- IOC code: MAW
- NOC: Olympic and Commonwealth Games Association of Malawi

in Barcelona
- Competitors: 4 in 1 sport
- Flag bearer: Smartex Tambala
- Medals: Gold 0 Silver 0 Bronze 0 Total 0

Summer Olympics appearances (overview)
- 1972; 1976–1980; 1984; 1988; 1992; 1996; 2000; 2004; 2008; 2012; 2016; 2020; 2024; 2028

Other related appearances
- Rhodesia (1960)

Malawi competed at the 1992 Summer Olympics in Barcelona, Spain.

== Competitors ==
The following is the list of number of competitors in the Games.

Sport	Men	Women	Total
Athletics	3	1	4
Total	3	1	4

== Athletics ==
Men

Athlete	Event	Heat		Semifinal		Final	
Athlete	Event	Result	Rank	Result	Rank	Result	Rank
Francis Munthali	800 m	1:56.69	8	did not advance			
John Mwathiwa	10000 m	—N/a				29:54.26	21
Smartex Tambala	Marathon	—N/a				2:29.02	63

Women

Athlete	Event	Heat		Semifinal		Final	
Athlete	Event	Result	Rank	Result	Rank	Result	Rank
Prisca Singamo	800 m	2:20.84	7	did not advance			

== Sources ==
- Official Olympic Reports
