= Smartex Tambala =

Malawian long-distance runner

Personal information
- Nationality: Malawian
- Born: 30 July 1965 (age 60)
- Height: 1.68 m (5 ft 6 in)
- Weight: 62 kg (137 lb)

Sport
- Sport: Long-distance running
- Event: Marathon

Smartex Godfrey Tambala (born 30 July 1965) is a Malawian former long-distance runner.

Smartex competed in the marathon at the 1992 Summer Olympics in Barcelona, finishing 63rd. His personal best in the event was 2:17:18, achieved in 1991, which is also the current Malawian national record. At the 1994 Commonwealth Games in Victoria, Smartex crossed the line in 17th place in the marathon, just ahead of fellow African athlete Moses Matabane of Lesotho.

Olympic Games
Preceded by George Mambosasa	Flagbearer for Malawi; 1992 Barcelona	Succeeded by John Mwathiwa
