= Athletics at the 2022 Commonwealth Games – Women's 400 metres =

Women's 400 metres at the 2022 Commonwealth Games
- Venue: Alexander Stadium
- Dates: 3 August (first round); 5 August (semifinals); 7 August (final)
- Competitors: 30 from 18 nations
- Winning time: 49.90

Medalists
gold medal	Sada Williams	Barbados
silver medal	Victoria Ohuruogu	England
bronze medal	Jodie Williams	England

The women's 400 metres at the 2022 Commonwealth Games, as part of the athletics programme, took place in the Alexander Stadium on 3, 5 and 7 August 2022.

== Records ==
Prior to this competition, the existing world and Games records were as follows:

World record	Marita Koch (GDR)	47.60	Canberra, Australia	6 October 1985
Commonwealth record	Shaunae Miller-Uibo (BAH)	48.36	Tokyo, Japan	6 August 2021
Games record	Amantle Montsho (BOT)	50.10	Delhi, India	8 October 2010

== Schedule ==
The schedule was as follows:

Date	Time	Round
Wednesday 3 August 2022	10:30	First round
Friday 5 August 2022	19:32	Semifinals
Sunday 7 August 2022	11:00	Final

All times are British Summer Time (UTC+1)

== Results ==
=== First round ===
First 3 in each heat (Q) and the next 4 fastest (q) advance to the Semifinals.

Rank	Heat	Lane	Name	Nation	Result	Notes
1	1	8	Victoria Ohuruogu	England	51.34	Q
2	3	2	Sada Williams	Barbados	51.66	Q
3	3	7	Zoey Clark	Scotland	51.84	Q
4	2	2	Kyra Constantine	Canada	52.03	Q
5	1	6	Junelle Bromfield	Jamaica	52.04	Q
6	1	9	Asimenye Simwaka	Malawi	52.19	Q, NR
7	2	7	Aliyah Abrams	Guyana	52.23	Q
8	4	7	Ama Pipi	England	52.46	Q
9	3	3	Jodie Williams	England	52.47	Q, SB
10	2	8	Nicole Yeargin	Scotland	52.52	Q
11	1	2	Patience Okon George	Nigeria	52.63	q
12	2	4	Veronica Kamumbe Mutua	Kenya	53.02	q
13	1	3	Micha Powell	Canada	53.13	q
14	3	6	Lydia Jele	Botswana	53.24	q
15	3	8	Roneisha McGregor	Jamaica	53.28	
16	4	2	Aiyanna Stiverne	Canada	53.45	Q
17	4	3	Leni Shida	Uganda	53.65	Q
18	3	9	Shereen Vallabouy	Malaysia	53.92 (.915)	
18	3	5	Shalysa Wray	Cayman Islands	53.92 (.915)	
20	4	5	Caitlyn Bobb	Bermuda	53.97	
21	4	9	Ella Onojuvwevwo	Nigeria	54.02	
22	1	4	Kenisha Phillips	Guyana	54.08	
23	1	5	Niddy Mingilishi	Zambia	54.30	
24	2	3	Patience Omovoh	Nigeria	54.40	
25	2	6	Janet Richard	Malta	54.51	
26	4	6	Christine Botlogetswe	Botswana	54.60	
27	1	7	Mary Thomas Tarawally	Sierra Leone	58.18	SB
28	2	5	Aishath Himna Hassan	Maldives	58.70	
29	4	8	Mary Moraa	Kenya	59.51	
30	3	4	Aminath Mohamed	Maldives	1:01.49	
	4	4	Ashontie Carr	Belize	DNS	
	2	9	Tiffany James	Jamaica	DNS	

=== Semifinals ===
First 3 in each heat (Q) and the next 2 fastest (q) advance to the Final.

Rank	Heat	Lane	Name	Nation	Result	Notes
1	1	5	Victoria Ohuruogu	England	51.00	Q
2	2	5	Sada Williams	Barbados	51.59	Q
3	1	9	Asimenye Simwaka	Malawi	51.70	Q, NR
4	2	7	Kyra Constantine	Canada	51.78	Q, =SB
5	1	6	Ama Pipi	England	51.95	Q
6	2	8	Jodie Williams	England	51.98	Q, SB
7	1	7	Zoey Clark	Scotland	51.99	q
8	2	6	Junelle Bromfield	Jamaica	52.18	q
9	2	9	Nicole Yeargin	Scotland	52.24	
10	2	4	Aliyah Abrams	Guyana	52.82	
11	1	3	Patience Okon George	Nigeria	52.90	
12	2	2	Micha Powell	Canada	53.37	
13	1	4	Aiyanna Stiverne	Canada	53.52	
14	1	8	Leni Shida	Uganda	53.77	
15	2	3	Veronica Kamumbe Mutua	Kenya	54.80	
16	1	2	Lydia Jele	Botswana	55.09	

=== Final ===
The medals were determined in the final.

Rank	Lane	Name	Result	Notes
1st place, gold medalist(s)	6	Sada Williams (BAR)	49.90	GR
2nd place, silver medalist(s)	4	Victoria Ohuruogu (ENG)	50.72	PB
3rd place, bronze medalist(s)	9	Jodie Williams (ENG)	51.26	SB
4	8	Ama Pipi (ENG)	51.36	
5	3	Junelle Bromfield (JAM)	51.45	
6	5	Asimenye Simwaka (MAW)	51.55	NR
7	7	Kyra Constantine (CAN)	51.75	SB
8	2	Zoey Clark (SCO)	51.90	
