= Henry Moyo =

Henry Moyo may refer to:

- Henry Moyo (runner) (born 1972), Malawian Olympic long-distance runner
- Henry Moyo (football) (1946–2012), Malawian football coach
