= Malawi at the 1988 Summer Olympics =

- IOC code: MAW
- NOC: Olympic and Commonwealth Games Association of Malawi

in Seoul
- Competitors: 16 in 3 sports
- Flag bearer: George Mambosasa
- Medals: Gold 0 Silver 0 Bronze 0 Total 0

Summer Olympics appearances (overview)
- 1972; 1976–1980; 1984; 1988; 1992; 1996; 2000; 2004; 2008; 2012; 2016; 2020; 2024

Other related appearances
- Rhodesia (1960)

Malawi competed at the 1988 Summer Olympics in Seoul, South Korea. Sixteen competitors, all men, took part in sixteen events in three sports.

== Competitors ==
The following is the list of number of competitors in the Games.

Sport	Men	Women	Total
Athletics	5	0	5
Boxing	7	–	7
Cycling	4	0	4
Total	16	0	16

== Athletics ==
Men
Track and road events

Athlete	Event	Heat Round 1		Heat Round 2		Semifinal		Final	
Athlete	Event	Time	Rank	Time	Rank	Time	Rank	Time	Rank
Odiya Silweya	200 metres	22.24	51	Did not advance					
Odiya Silweya	400 metres	49.73	65	Did not advance					
Kenneth Dzekedzeke	800 metres	1:50.60	46	Did not advance					
Kenneth Dzekedzeke	1500 metres	4:02.61	54	—		Did not advance			
George Mambosasa	5000 metres	14:30.01	44	—		Did not advance			
Charles Naveko	10,000 metres	31:23.53	39	—				Did not advance	
George Mambosasa	Marathon	—						DNF	
John Mwathiwa	Marathon	—						2:51:43	87

== Boxing ==
Athlete	Event	Round of 64	Round of 32	Round of 16	Quarterfinals	Semifinals	Final	
Athlete	Event	Opposition Result	Opposition Result	Opposition Result	Opposition Result	Opposition Result	Opposition Result	Rank
Peter Ayesu	Flyweight	Bye	Mwangata (TAN); L 0–5	Did not advance				
Evance Malenga	Featherweight	Tauatama (WSM); L 0–5	Did not advance					
John Elson Mkangala	Lightweight	Bye	Cramne (SWE); L 0–5	Did not advance				
Lyton Mphande	Light welterweight	Bhujel (NEP); W 5–0	Kampompo Miango (ZAI); W Walkover	Mwamba (ZAM); L KO	Did not advance			
Boston Simbeye	Welterweight	Ankamah (GHA); L KO	Did not advance					
M'tendere Makalamba	Light middleweight	Bye	Jones, Jr. (USA); L KO	Did not advance				
Helman Palije	Middleweight	Bye	Maske (GDR); L 0–5	Did not advance				

== Cycling ==
Four cyclists represented Malawi in 1988.

=== Road ===
Men

Athlete	Event	Time	Rank
Dyton Chimwaza	Road race	4:52:43	109
George Nayeja	Road race	DNF	
Amadu Yusufu	Road race	DNF	
Dyton Chimwaza; Daniel Kaswanga; George Nayeja; Amadu Yusufu	Team time trial	2:32:37.6	30
