= Mustapha Bamouh =

Moroccan long-distance runner

Mustapha Bamouh (born 21 December 1972) is a retired Moroccan runner who specialized in the 10,000 metres.

On the track he won the bronze medal at the 1995 Military World Games, the silver medal at the 1995 Arab Championships, the gold medal at the 1997 Pan Arab Games and did not finish at the 2001 Jeux de la Francophonie. He became Moroccan champion in the 5000 metres in 1995 and 1996.

At the 1995 World Cross Country Championships he finished 41st and won a silver medal as a member of the six-man Moroccan team. At the 1996 World Cross Country Championships he finished 29th and won another team silver. At the 1996 World Cross Country Championships he finished 82nd, and at the 2000 World Cross Country Championships he finished 24th. He also won the World Military Cross Country Championships in 1996, 1997, 1999 and 2000.

His personal best times were 7:49.59 minutes in the 3000 metres, achieved in May 1996 in Rhede; 13:38.12 minutes in the 5000 metres, achieved in June 2000 in Formia (13:37.0 with manual timing); 28:06.39 minutes in the 10,000 metres, achieved in May 1996 in Bratislava; 1:04:54 hours in the half marathon, achieved in October 2004 in Rouen; and 2:26:44 hours in the marathon, achieved in April 2006 in Albi.
