= Inga Juodeškienė =

Lithuanian long-distance runner (born 1971)

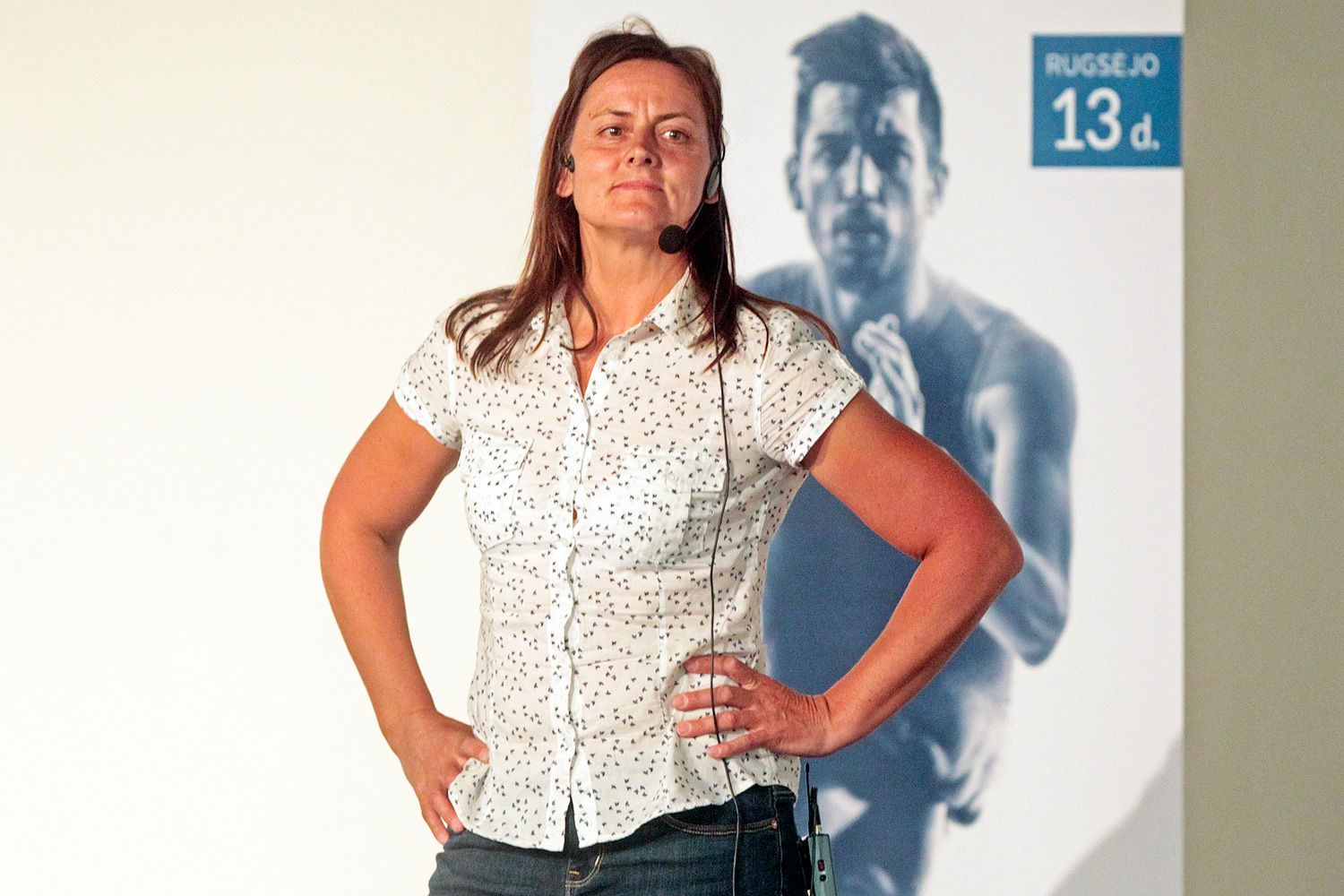

Personal information
- Full name: Inga Petrauskaitė; Juodeškienė
- Nationality: Lithuania
- Born: 21 October 1971 (age 55) Šiauliai, Lithuanian SSR, Soviet Union
- Height: 1.67 m (5 ft 5 1/2 in)
- Weight: 51 kg (112 lb)

Sport
- Sport: Athletics
- Events: Long-distance running, marathon

Achievements and titles
- Personal bests: 5000 m: 15:28.66; Marathon: 2:31:30

Inga Petrauskaitė-Juodeškienė (born 21 October 1971 in Šiauliai) is a retired Lithuanian long-distance runner. She represented her nation Lithuania in two editions of the Olympic Games (2000 and 2004), and also set her own personal best of 2:31:30 in the women's division at the 2002 Frankfurt Marathon in Frankfurt, Germany. Before turning her sights to marathon in 2002, Juodeskiene ran a national record of 15:28.66 in the women's 5000 metres at the IAAF Permit Meet in Heusden-Zolder, Belgium that guaranteed her a spot on the Lithuanian team for the 2000 Summer Olympics.

Juodeskiene made her official debut at the 2000 Summer Olympics in Sydney, where she competed in the women's 5000 metres. She ran outside her career best of 15:46.37 to obtain a twelfth spot in a field of seventeen athletes during the third heat, but failed to advance further into the final.

At the 2004 Summer Olympics in Athens, Juodeskiene qualified for her second Lithuanian squad in the women's marathon at the 2004 Summer Olympics in Athens, by finishing third and registering an A-standard entry time of 2:31:30 from the Frankfurt Marathon. She finished the race with a sixty-third place time in 3:09:18 over a vast field of 83 marathon runners, trailing further behind gold medalist Mizuki Noguchi of Japan by forty seconds.
