= Breda Dennehy-Willis =

Irish long-distance runner (born 1970)

Breeda Dennehy Willis
Personal information
- Nationality: Irish
- Born: 2 February 1970 (age 56)

Sport
- Sport: Long-distance running
- Event: 5000 metres

Breda Dennehy-Willis (born 3 February 1970) is an Irish long-distance runner. She competed in the women's 5000 metres at the 2000 Summer Olympics.

Her daughter, Roisin Willis, u20 World Champion 800 meters 1:59.13 Gold medal relay 4×400 meters, was an American-based high school athlete who qualified for the 2021 US Olympic trials in the 800m.
