= 2004 World Junior Championships in Athletics – Women's 5000 metres =

2004 world junior championship womens5000 meters

The women's 5000 metres event at the 2004 World Junior Championships in Athletics was held in Grosseto, Italy, at Stadio Olimpico Carlo Zecchini on 13 July.

== Medalists ==
Gold	Meselech Melkamu; Ethiopia
Silver	Catherine Chikwakwa; Malawi
Bronze	Chiaki Iwamoto; Japan

== Results ==
=== Final ===
13 July

Rank	Name	Nationality	Time	Notes
1st place, gold medalist(s)	Meselech Melkamu	Ethiopia	15:21.52	
2nd place, silver medalist(s)	Catherine Chikwakwa	Malawi	15:36.22	
3rd place, bronze medalist(s)	Chiaki Iwamoto	Japan	15:39.59	
4	Sun Weiwei	China	15:50.67	
5	Caitlin Chock	United States	15:52.88	
6	Rehima Kedir	Ethiopia	15:54.34	
7	Yuko Nohara	Japan	15:57.51	
8	Olga Minina	Belarus	15:58.93	
9	Viktoriya Kharitonova	Russia	16:04.41	
10	Viola Jemutai Kiplagat	Kenya	16:23.85	
11	Edith Chelimo	Kenya	16:25.24	
12	Hind Musa	Sudan	16:50.02	
13	Adelina De Soccio	Italy	16:51.12	
14	Paula Todoran	Romania	17:24.76	
15	Thet Phyu War	Myanmar	18:07.91	
	Safa Aissaoui	Tunisia	DNF	

== Participation ==
According to an unofficial count, 16 athletes from 13 countries participated in the event.

- Belarus (1)
- China (1)
- Ethiopia (2)
- Italy (1)
- Japan (2)
- Kenya (2)
- Malawi (1)
- Myanmar (1)
- Romania (1)
- Russia (1)
- Sudan (1)
- Tunisia (1)
- United States (1)
