= Athletics at the 1990 Commonwealth Games – Men's marathon =

Men's marathon at the Commonwealth Games

The men's marathon event at the 1990 Commonwealth Games was held in Auckland, New Zealand on 30 January 1990.

== Results ==
Rank	Name	Nationality	Time	Notes
1st place, gold medalist(s)	Douglas Wakiihuri	Kenya	2:10:27	
2nd place, silver medalist(s)	Steve Moneghetti	Australia	2:10:34	
3rd place, bronze medalist(s)	Simon Robert Naali	Tanzania	2:10:38	
4	Steve Jones	Wales	2:12:44	
5	Ibrahim Hussein	Kenya	2:13:20	
6	Daniel Nzioka	Kenya	2:13:27	
7	Rex Wilson	New Zealand	2:13:48	
8	Geoffrey Wightman	England	2:14:16	
9	Steve Brace	Wales	2:16:16	
10	Thabiso Moqhali	Lesotho	2:17:33	
11	Juma Ikangaa	Tanzania	2:18:47	
12	Ernest Tjela	Lesotho	2:18:48	
13	Robert De Castella	Australia	2:18:50	
14	Bigboy Matlapeng	Botswana	2:20:18	
15	Motsemme Kgaotsang	Botswana	2:20:41	
16	John Mwathiwa	Malawi	2:23:31	
17	Paul Herlihy	New Zealand	2:24:52	
18	Nicholas Nyengerayi	Zimbabwe	2:26:20	
19	Bradley Camp	Australia	2:27:05	
20	David Mponye	Lesotho	2:27:26	
21	Vusie Dlamini	Swaziland	2:27:55	
22	Gordon Christie	Canada	2:32:19	
23	Sebio Sikanyika	Zambia	2:33:23	
	Carl Thackery	England	DNF	
	Tony Milovsorov	England	DNF	
	William Tweed	Jersey	DNF	
	John Campbell	New Zealand	DNF	
	Alfred Shahanga	Tanzania	DNF	
	Peter Biggs	Falkland Islands	DNS	
	William Goss	Falkland Islands	DNS	
	Derick Adamson	Jamaica	DNS	
	Moneri Lebesa	Lesotho	DNS	
