= Athletics at the 1990 Commonwealth Games – Men's 10,000 metres =

Men's 10,000 metres at the Commonwealth Games

The men's 10,000 metres event at the 1990 Commonwealth Games was held on 27 January at the Mount Smart Stadium in Auckland.

== Results ==
Rank	Name	Nationality	Time	Notes
1st place, gold medalist(s)	Eamonn Martin	England	28:08.57	
2nd place, silver medalist(s)	Moses Tanui	Kenya	28:11.56	
3rd place, bronze medalist(s)	Paul Williams	Canada	28:12.71	
4	Gary Staines	England	28:13.62	
5	Joseph Kibor	Kenya	28:27.56	
6	Peter Brett	Australia	28:37.16	
7	Kerry Rodger	New Zealand	28:46.55	
8	Paul McCloy	Canada	29:02.21	
9	Carey Nelson	Canada	29:02.29	
10	Sammy Bitok	Kenya	29:25.46	
11	Isaac Simelane	Swaziland	29:28.59	
12	Tim Hutchings	England	29:34.12	
13	Malcolm Norwood	Australia	30:06.70	
14	Mark Furlan	New Zealand	30:39.90	
15	John Mwathiwa	Malawi	30:52.26	
16	Clive Hamilton	Jamaica	31:13.91	
17	Moneri Lebesa	Lesotho	31:45.94	
18	Derick Adamson	Jamaica	31:59.11	
19	Aaron Dupnai	Papua New Guinea	32:22.25	
20	William Goss	Falkland Islands	39:51.71	
21	Peter Biggs	Falkland Islands	40:26.14	
	Try Chinhoyi	Zimbabwe	DNF	
	Zacharia Ditetso	Botswana	DNF	
	Steve Moneghetti	Australia	DNS	
	Steve Jones	Wales	DNS	
