= Mike Tebulo =

Malawian long-distance runner

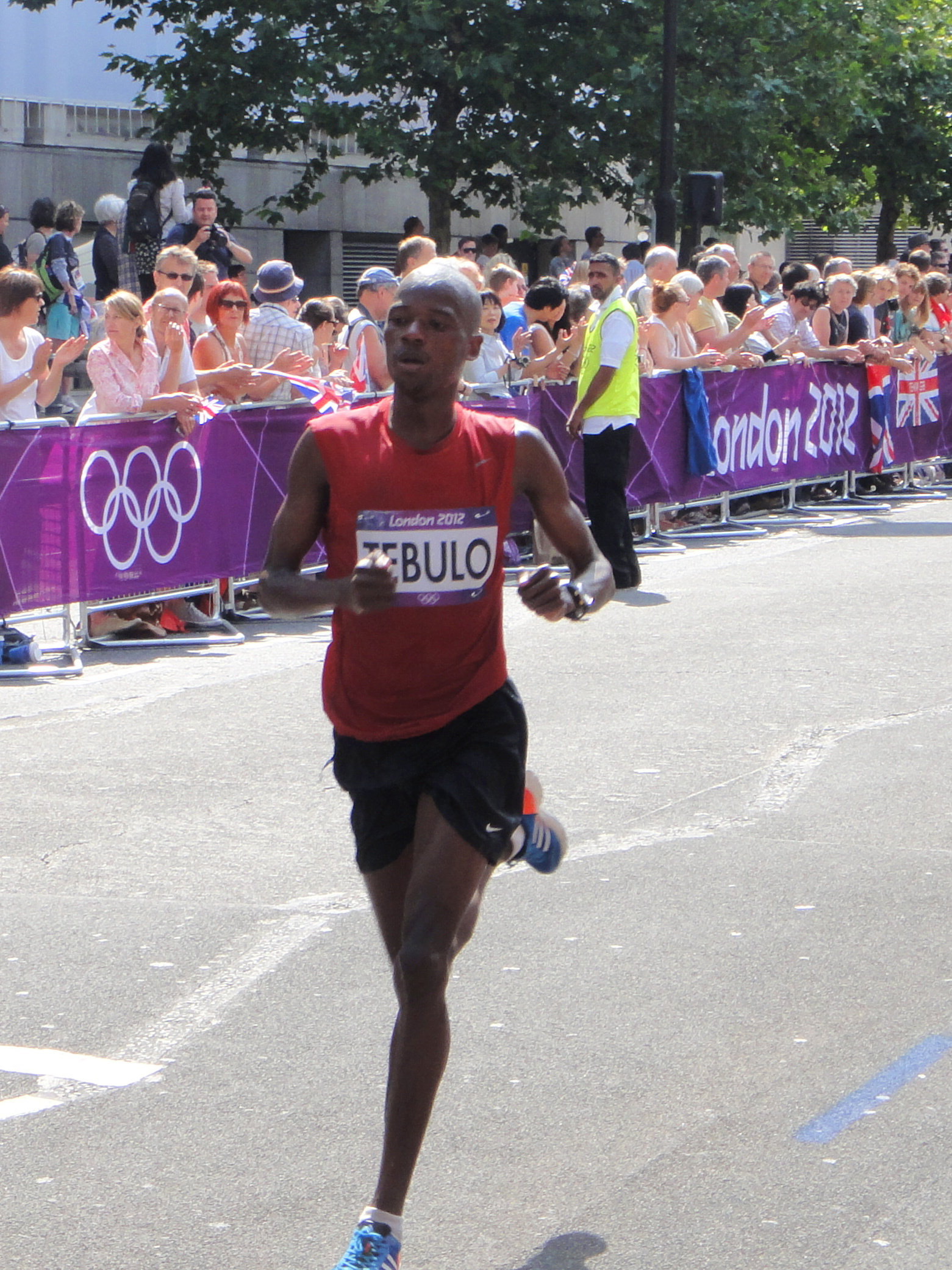
- Tebulo in the marathon at the 2012 Summer Olympics in London

Personal information
- Born: 5 June 1985 (age 41)
- Height: 1.76 m (5 ft 9 1/2 in)
- Weight: 76 kg (168 lb)

Sport
- Country: Malawi
- Sport: Athletics
- Event: Marathon

Mike Tebulo (born 5 June 1985 in Zomba, Malawi) is a Malawian long-distance runner.

== Biography ==
He competed in the men's marathon at the 2012 Summer Olympics and was the flag bearer for the Malawi team at the opening ceremony. In the marathon, he finished 44th with a seasonal best time of 2:19:11.

Olympic Games
Preceded by Charlton Nyirenda	Flagbearer for Malawi; 2012 London	Succeeded by Kefasi Chitsala
