= Athletics at the 2014 Commonwealth Games – Women's marathon =

Women's marathon at the Commonwealth Games

The Women's marathon at the 2014 Commonwealth Games, as part of the athletics programme, was held in Glasgow on 27 July 2014. The same course is used for both Men's marathon and Women's marathon.

== Results ==
Rank	Athlete	Time	Notes
1st place, gold medalist(s)	Flomena Cheyech Daniel (KEN)	2:26:45	
2nd place, silver medalist(s)	Caroline Kilel (KEN)	2:27:10	
3rd place, bronze medalist(s)	Jessica Trengove (AUS)	2:30:12	
4	Lanni Marchant (CAN)	2:31:14	
5	Helalia Johannes (NAM)	2:32:02	
6	Susan Partridge (SCO)	2:32:18	
7	Louise Damen (ENG)	2:32:59	
8	Melanie Panayiotou (AUS)	2:35:01	
9	Amy Whitehead (ENG)	2:35:06	
10	Sarah Klein (AUS)	2:35:21	
11	Beata Naigambo (NAM)	2:39:23	
12	Gladys Ganiel (NIR)	2:40:29	
13	Hayley Haining (SCO)	2:40:40	
14	Joasia Zakrzewski (SCO)	2:45:29	
15	Tereza Master (MAW)	2:50:54	
16	Ntahleng Masaile (LES)	2:51:30	
17	Moleboheng Mafata (LES)	2:52:30	
−	Alyson Dixon (ENG)	DNF	
−	Alison Edwards (GIB)	DNF	
−	Leena Ekandjo (NAM)	DNF	
−	Philes Ongori (KEN)	DNF	
