= Daniel Mkandawire =

Malawian athlete

Personal information
- Nationality: Malawian
- Born: 26 December 1951 (age 74)
- Height: 1.83 m (6 ft 0 in)
- Weight: 71 kg (157 lb)

Sport
- Sport: Track and field
- Events: High jump, Triple jump

Daniel Mkandawire (born 26 December 1951) is a Malawian former high jumper and triple jumper. Mkandawire set a Malawian national record for the triple jump with a distance of 14.30 metres set in 1970. He also competed at the 1972 Summer Olympics, representing Malawi in one men's athletics event.

He competed in the qualifying stage of the men's high jump. He cleared his first attempt in one try but would fail all of his subsequent attempts at a higher height. He placed equal 36th out of all of the competitors that competed in the event, not advancing to the finals of the event.

== Biography ==
Mkandawire competed at the 1972 Summer Olympics in Munich, Germany, representing Malawi in one men's athletics event. He is one of the first Malawian competitors to compete at an Olympic Games as the nation had made their debut at these Summer Games. Before the 1972 Summer Games, he set a Malawian national record for the triple jump with a distance of 14.30 m (46 ft 11 in) in Blantyre on 7 May 1970.

Mkandawire competed in the qualifying stage of the men's high jump on 9 September against 17 other competitors in his group. There, he cleared his first attempt of 1.90 metres on his first attempt but would fail all of his subsequent attempts at 2.00 metres. He was credited with the height of his first distance and would place equal 36th out of all of the competitors that competed, not advancing to the finals of the event. In the same year, he set a new personal best in the high jump with a height of 2.00 metres.
