= Yuji Nakamura =

Japanese long-distance runner

Yuji Nakamura (中村 祐二, Nakamura Yūji; born 29 April 1970) is a Japanese long-distance runner who specialized in the marathon.

He finished twelfth at the 1995 World Championships in 2:17:30 hours.

== Achievements ==
Year	Competition	Venue	Position	Event	Notes
Representing Japan
1995	World Championships	Gothenburg, Sweden	12th	Marathon	2:17:30
