= Malawi at the Olympics =

- IOC code: MAW
- NOC: Olympic and Commonwealth Games Association of Malawi
- Website: www.moc.org.mw
- Medals: Gold 0 Silver 0 Bronze 0 Total 0

Summer appearances
- 1972; 1976–1980; 1984; 1988; 1992; 1996; 2000; 2004; 2008; 2012; 2016; 2020; 2024; 2028

Other related appearances
- Rhodesia (1960)

Malawi has competed in 12 Summer Olympic Games since its debut in 1972. The nation has never competed in the Winter Olympic Games.

The country's first Olympics was the 1972 Munich Olympics. Malawi didn't compete in the 1976 in Montreal because no athletes had qualified. Malawi boycotted the 1980 Summer Olympics and returned during the 1984 Summer Olympics.

Malawi has never won an Olympic medal. Its best finish is a quarterfinal (5th) placement by boxer Peter Ayesu at the flyweight event at the 1984 Summer Olympics.

== Medal tables ==
=== Medals by Summer Games ===
Games	Athletes	Gold	Silver	Bronze	Total	Rank
1960 Rome	as part of Rhodesia					
1964 Tokyo	did not participate					
1968 Mexico City	did not participate					
1972 Munich	16	0	0	0	0	–
1976 Montreal	did not participate					
1980 Moscow	did not participate					
1984 Los Angeles	15	0	0	0	0	–
1988 Seoul	16	0	0	0	0	–
1992 Barcelona	4	0	0	0	0	–
1996 Atlanta	2	0	0	0	0	–
2000 Sydney	2	0	0	0	0	–
2004 Athens	4	0	0	0	0	–
2008 Beijing	4	0	0	0	0	–
2012 London	3	0	0	0	0	–
2016 Rio de Janeiro	5	0	0	0	0	–
2020 Tokyo	5	0	0	0	0	–
2024 Paris	3	0	0	0	0	–
2028 Los Angeles	future event					
2032 Brisbane	future event					
Total		0	0	0	0	–

== See also ==
- List of flag bearers for Malawi at the Olympics
