= Joseph Tjitunga =

Namibian marathon runner

Joseph Tjitunga (born 21 July 1971) is a Namibian marathon runner. Tjitunga competed for Namibia at the 1996 Summer Olympics in the men's marathon, where he finished 76th of 124 competitors. As of 2006, Tjitunga held the third fastest time for a Namibian runner in the marathon . Tjitunga also competed at the 1995 and 1997 World Championships in Athletics. In the former he set his P.R. in the marathon of 2:21:57.

After retiring from athletics, he joined the Namibian Police Force.
