= Kondwani Chiwina =

Malawian middle-distance runner

Kondwani Chiwina is a retired Malawi middle-distance runner who specialized in the 800 metres. Just as is common for most African athletes, he discovered his ability to run by chance. While at Mtendere Secondary School in Dedza district (Central Malawi), Chiwina was scheduled to meet a relative some 11 km away from the school. Having no money to pay for his bus fare, Chiwina decided to run the distance and to his surprise, he covered the distance in 48 minutes despite lacking proper running shoes or prior training.

Chiwina went on to compete for Malawi at the 2003 FISU Summer Universiade Games in DAEGU South Korea, the 2004 Summer Olympics in Anthens, the 2004 IAAF World Indoor Championships in Budapest, and the 2005 Summer Universiade held in Izmir Türkey. His Personal best time for 800m was achieved at the Athens 2004 Olympic games where he clocked 1:49.87. In 2004 he won a Silver medal at the Zone Six University Students Games held in Namibia and clocked 1:51.00. Kondwani Chiwina gave up competitive sports in 2014 after obtaining an MSc. in Environmental Management at the University of Kiel in Germany.

Olympic Games
Preceded by Francis Munthali	Flagbearer for Malawi; 2004 Athens	Succeeded by Charlton Nyirenda
