= Stern Noel Liffa =

Malawian sprinter

Noel Stern Liffa
Personal information
- Nationality: Malawian
- Born: 17 July 2000 (age 26)

Sport
- Sport: Athletics
- Event: Sprinting

Noel Stern Liffa (born 17 July 2000) is a Malawian athlete. He competed in the men's 100 metres event at the 2019 World Athletics Championships. He competed in the preliminary round and he did not advance to compete in the heats.

Liffa won the 2019 Malawi Sportsman of the Year award. He set the Malawian 100 m record several times, lowering it from 10.8 down to 10.33 seconds in 2022.
