= John Mwathiwa =

Malawian long-distance runner

John Mwathiwa (born 1 March 1967 in Zomba) is a Malawian long distance runner.

He represented Malawi at the 1988, 1992 and 1996 Summer Olympics as well as at the 1991, 1993 and 1995 World Championships. He never qualified for the final round.

== Achievements ==
Year	Competition	Venue	Position	Event	Notes
Representing Malawi
1988	Olympic Games	Seoul, South Korea	87th	Marathon	2:51:43
1990	Commonwealth Games	Auckland, New Zealand	15th	10,000 m	30:52.26
1990	Commonwealth Games	Auckland, New Zealand	16th	Marathon	2:23.31
1991	World Championships	Tokyo, Japan	29th (h)	10,000 m	30:31.43
1992	Olympic Games	Seoul, South Korea	39th (h)	10,000 m	29:54.26
1993	World Championships	Stuttgart, Germany	31st (h)	10,000 m	29:45.55
1994	Commonwealth Games	Victoria, Canada	13th	Marathon	2:20:11
1995	World Championships	Gothenburg, Sweden	34th	Marathon	2:24:01
1996	Olympic Games	Atlanta, United States	65th	Marathon	2:24:45
1998	Commonwealth Games	Kuala Lumpur, Malaysia	13th	Marathon	2:25:27
1999	All-Africa Games	Johannesburg, South Africa	15th	Marathon	2:34:44

Olympic Games
Preceded by Smartex Tambala	Flagbearer for Malawi; 1996 Atlanta	Succeeded by Francis Munthali
