= Nils Antonio =

Jamaican long-distance runner

Personal information
- Nationality: Jamaican
- Born: 31 March 1963 (age 62)

Sport
- Sport: Long-distance running
- Event: Marathon

Nils Antonio (born 31 March 1963) is a Jamaican long-distance runner. He competed in the men's marathon at the 1996 Summer Olympics.
