= Martin Matupi =

Malawian former triple jumper

Personal information
- Nationality: Malawian
- Born: 26 November 1942 (age 83)
- Height: 1.70 m (5 ft 7 in)
- Weight: 66 kg (146 lb)

Sport
- Sport: Track and field
- Event: Triple jump

Martin Matupi (born 26 November 1942) is a Malawian former triple jumper.

Competing in the men's triple jump at the 1972 Summer Olympics in Munich, he finished in 34th place with a distance of 13.57 metres. Matupi was the Malawian flag carrier in the opening ceremony at the Games.
