= Jessica Makwenda =

Malawian swimmer (born 2005)

Personal information
- Born: October 21, 2005 (age 20) Lilongwe, Malawi

Sport
- Sport: Swimming

Jessica Makwenda (born 21 October 2005) is a Malawian swimmer. She was one of five Malawian sportspeople to take part in the 2020 Summer Olympics.

She carried the Malawian flag in the Parade of Nations at the 2020 Summer Olympics opening ceremony along with archer Areneo David. She competed in the women's 50m freestyle, allocated to Heat 4 on 30 July.

Olympic Games
Preceded by Kefasi Chitsala	Flag bearer for Malawi; Tokyo 2020 with Areneo David	Succeeded by Filipe Gomes; Asimenye Simwaka
