= Emesia Chizunga =

Malawian middle-distance runner (born 1954)

Personal information
- Nationality: Malawian
- Born: 3 March 1954 (age 72)

Sport
- Sport: Middle-distance running
- Event: 800 metres

Emesia Chizunga (born 3 March 1954) is a Malawian middle-distance runner. She competed in the women's 800 metres at the 1972 Summer Olympics. She did not advance from the heats but she did lead the pack for most of the first lap.

She was the first woman to represent Malawi at the Olympics.

== See also ==
Prisca Singamo - also later represented Malawi at the Olympics as another Malawian Olympic 800 metre runner.
