= Joaquim Silva (runner) =

Portuguese long-distance runner

Personal information
- Born: January 13, 1961 (age 65) Vila Nova de Gaia, Portugal

Sport
- Sport: Marathon running

Joaquim Fernando da Mota Silva (born January 13, 1961) is a retired long-distance runner from Portugal, who won the 1994 edition of the Vienna Marathon. He represented his native country in the men's marathon at the 1988 Summer Olympics in Seoul, South Korea, finishing in 27th place (2:18:05). And father of the late Diogo Jota and André Silva.

== Achievements ==
Year	Competition	Venue	Position	Event	Notes
Representing Portugal
1985	Universiade	Kobe, Japan	22nd (h)	1500 m	3:52.29
1988	Olympic Games	Seoul, South Korea	27th	Marathon	2:18:05
1989	Lisbon Marathon	Lisbon, Portugal	1st	Marathon	2:16:56
1994	Vienna Marathon	Vienna, Austria	1st	Marathon	2:10:42
1995	World Championships	Gothenburg, Sweden	—	Marathon	DNF
1998	European Championships	Budapest, Hungary	26th	Marathon	2:17:55
