= Charlton Nyirenda =

Malawian swimmer

Personal information
- Born: August 29, 1988 (age 37)

Sport
- Sport: Swimming

Charlton Nyirenda (born 29 August 1988) is a competitive swimmer from Malawi. He competed in the 2008 Summer Olympics in Beijing, China, and was the flag-bearer for his nation during the opening ceremonies of those games.

Olympic Games
Preceded by Kondwani Chiwina	Flagbearer for Malawi; 2008 Beijing	Succeeded by Mike Tebulo
