= Kefasi Chitsala =

Malawian long-distance runner (born 1994)

Kefasi Kasiteni Chitsala (born 24 June 1994) is a Malawian long-distance runner. He competed at the 2016 Summer Olympics in the men's 5000 metres race; his time of 14:52.89 in the heats did not qualify him for the final. He was the flag bearer for Malawi in the Parade of Nations.

Olympic Games
Preceded by Mike Tebulo	Flagbearer for Malawi; 2016 Rio de Janeiro	Succeeded by Jessica Makwenda; Areneo David
