= Elphas Ginindza =

Swazi long-distance runner

Personal information
- Nationality: Swazi
- Born: 23 August 1967 (age 59)

Sport
- Sport: Long-distance running
- Event: Marathon

Elphas Sabelo Ginindza (born 23 August 1967) is a Swazi long-distance runner. He competed in the men's marathon at the 1992 Summer Olympics.
