= George Mambosasa =

Malawian long-distance runner

Personal information
- Nationality: Malawian
- Born: 31 January 1964 (age 62)
- Height: 1.69 m (5 ft 7 in)
- Weight: 61 kg (134 lb)

Sport
- Sport: Long-distance running
- Events: 5000 metres Marathon

George Mambosasa (born 31 January 1964) is a Malawian former long-distance runner.

George competed in both the 5000 metres and the marathon at the 1984 Summer Olympics in Los Angeles. He finished twelfth in heat one of the 5000 metres and so failed to qualify for the next round, and he completed the marathon in 74th place. At the 1988 Summer Olympics in Seoul, he took part in the marathon but did not finish. Mambosasa was the Malawian flag carrier in the opening ceremony at these games.

In the men's 5000 metres event at the 1986 Commonwealth Games in Edinburgh, Mambosasa set the current Malawian national record for the men's 3000 metres with a time of 8:25.3.

Olympic Games
Preceded by Fletcher Kapito	Flagbearer for Malawi; 1988 Seoul	Succeeded by Smartex Tambala
