= Tereza Master =

Malawian athlete

Personal information
- Born: 21 September 1988 (age 37)

Sport
- Sport: Track and field
- Event: Marathon

Tereza Master (born 21 September 1988) is a Malawian long-distance runner who specialises in the marathon. She competed in the women's marathon event at the 2016 Summer Olympics where she finished in 98th place with a time of 2:48:34, a national record.
