= Ambwene Simukonda =

Malawian sprinter

Personal information
- Born: March 23, 1984 (age 41)
- Height: 1.7 m (5 ft 7 in)
- Weight: 70 kg (154 lb)

Sport
- Country: Malawi
- Sport: Athletics
- Event: 400m

Ambwene Simukonda (born 23 March 1984 in Blantyre) is a Malawian sprinter who specializes in the 400 metres. She represented Malawi at the 2012 Summer Olympics where she became the quickest ever Malawian 400m female runner (54.20).
