= Filipe Gomes (swimmer) =

Malawian swimmer (born 1997)

Personal information
- Nationality: Malawian
- Born: 7 April 1997 (age 29) Blantyre, Malawi

Sport
- Sport: Swimming

Filipe Gomes (born 7 April 1997) is a Malawian swimmer. He competed in the men's 50 metre freestyle at the 2020 Summer Olympics.

Olympic Games
Preceded by Areneo David; Jessica Makwenda	Flag bearer for Malawi; Paris 2024 with Asimenye Simwaka	Succeeded by Incumbent
