= Areneo David =

Malawian archer (born 1995)

Personal information
- Born: 6 June 1995 (age 31) Lilongwe, Malawi
- Height: 1.64 m (5 ft 5 in)
- Weight: 58 kg (128 lb)

Sport
- Country: Malawi
- Sport: Archery
- Event: Recurve
- Coached by: Park Young-sook

Areneo David (born 6 June 1995) is a Malawian competitive archer. At the 2016 Summer Olympics in Rio de Janeiro, David became the first archer to compete for Malawi in an Olympic tournament, shooting only in the men's individual recurve through a tripartite invitation. For the 72-arrow qualifying round, David discharged 603 points out of a possible 720 to take the sixty-second spot from a field of 64 archers, before he faced his initial challenge against the third-seeded Italian archer David Pasqualucci, which led to his abrupt departure from the tournament at 0–6.

At the 2020 Summer Olympics, he competed in the men's individual event.

Olympic Games
Preceded by Kefasi Chitsala	Flag bearer for Malawi; Tokyo 2020 with Jessica Makwenda	Succeeded by Filipe Gomes; Asimenye Simwaka
