= Catherine Chikwakwa =

Malawian long-distance runner (born 1985)

Catherine Agnes Chikwakwa (born 24 July 1985 in Blantyre) is a Malawian long-distance runner. She has represented her country at both the 2000 Sydney Olympics and the 2004 Athens Olympics, as well as several Commonwealth Games. She was the 5000 metres silver medallist at the 2004 World Junior Championships in Athletics, held in Grosseto, Italy.

== Athletic career ==
At the age of 15, Chikwakwa was selected for the Malawi team at the 2000 Summer Olympics in Sydney, Australia. She did not progress past the first round, finishing 15th in her heat. As with the 2002 Olympics, she was the sole female athlete in the Malawi team at the 2002 Commonwealth Games in Manchester, England. She was one of 17 athletes from a variety of countries who had lunch with Queen Elizabeth II, Chikwakwa later said "She asked about my home, and my family, and my training. She said she liked to talk to young people." She finished 13th out of the 16 athletes in the 5000 metre final.

That same year, Chikwakwa came closest any Malawian had to automatically qualifying for an Olympic games when she set a time of 15 minutes and 31 seconds in the 5000 metres. In 2003, she won Malawi's first ever medal in international athletics, when she came second in the 5000 metres at the 2004 World Junior Championships in Athletics in Grosseto, Italy. She competed once again at the Olympics at the 2004 Games in Athens, Greece. She placed 15th in the second heat, which did not qualify her for the final.

There was controversy in the selection process for the 2006 Commonwealth Games, as despite the call from Minister of Sports Jaffalie Mussa to include Chikwakwa in the squad, she was not selected. In 2012, she stated that she was working towards qualification for the 2014 Commonwealth Games.

== Personal life ==
In 2008, she joined the British Army and began to work towards citizenship. Chikwakwa had considered seeking to representing Great Britain in athletics, but instead remained with Malawi. She resides in Edinburgh with her husband Remus Chunda, whom she married in 2005 and together have two children Romulus Chunda and Tiffany Chunda.

Catherine won several medals during her service in the British Army. Her active years were between 2009 and 2011. By 2016, she decided to enrol for an access to nursing course with Harriet Ellis Training Solutions (a private college) while still in British Army.

== Achievements ==
Year	Competition	Venue	Position	Event	Notes
Representing Malawi
2001	World Youth Championships	Debrecen, Hungary	7th	3000 m	9:35.41
2002	Commonwealth Games	Manchester, England	13th	5000 m	15:56.71
2004	World Junior Championships	Grosseto, Italy	2nd	5000 m	15:36.22
