= Baatarkhüügiin Battsetseg =

Mongolian long-distance runner (born 1976)

Personal information
- Nationality: Mongolian
- Born: 21 January 1976 (age 50)

Sport
- Sport: Long-distance running
- Event: 5000 metres

Baatarkhüügiin Battsetseg is a retired Mongolian long-distance runner, born on 21 January 1976. She represented Mongolia in the women's 5000 meters at the 2000 Summer Olympics in Sydney. Throughout her career, she competed in various international events, including the 2009 Asian Championships, where she placed eighth in both the 5000 meters and 10,000 meters. She also secured a bronze medal in the 10,000 meters at the 2009 East Asian Games in Hong Kong. Battsetseg ended her athletic career in 2009 at the age of 33.
