= Henry Moyo (runner) =

Malawian long-distance runner

Henry Moyo (born 8 February 1972) is a Malawian former long distance runner who competed in the 1996 Summer Olympics.

Moyo began his career in 1992, winning several national and international medals. He was a four-time winner of the Nico / Blantyre Marathon. He hinted at retirement from athletics in 2019.
