= Asimenye Simwaka =

Malawian athlete and footballer

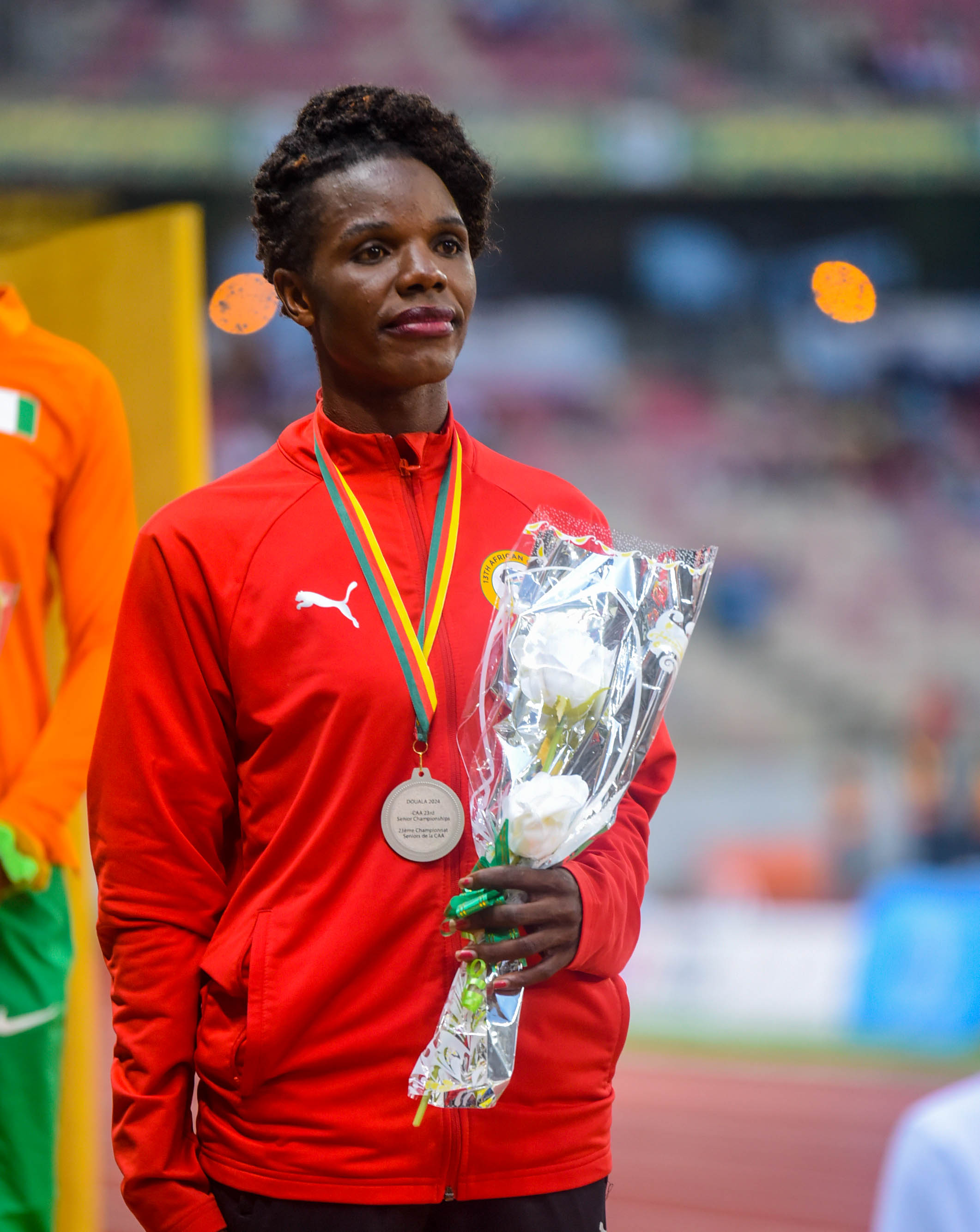
- Simwaka in 2024

Personal information
- Nationality: Malawian
- Born: 8 August 1997 (age 29) Malawi

Sport
- Country: Malawi
- Sport: Track and field, football
- Event: Sprints
Medal record
Women's athletics
Representing Malawi
African Championships
Bronze medal – third place	2024 Douala	200 m
Women's Africa Cup of Nations
Silver medal – second place	2026 Morocco

Asimenye Simwaka (born 8 August 1997) is a Malawian athlete and footballer who plays as a forward for the Malawi national team. She competed in the 2020 and 2024 Paris Olympics, carrying the flag for Malawi on both. She is employed by the Malawian Defence Force.

== Athletics career ==
In February 2020 she surprised herself and the other competitors when she entered the National Cross-Country championships in Mzuzu and she won it.

Simwaka competed at the 2020 Summer Olympics in Tokyo as the sole Malawian track and field athlete. After breaking the Malawian national record in the women's 100 meters preliminary heats, she simultaneously became the national record holder for the 100, 200 and 400 meters. She improved her national record in the subsequent heats with a time of 11.68 seconds but did not qualify for the semi-finals.

Simwaka carried the Malawian flag at the 2024 Paris Olympics. She participated in the 100m heats but was unable to advance due to a hamstring injury.

On 15 February 2025 she decided to not be a member of National Football team so that could defend her national champion status at the cross-country championship at the Kamuzu Academy's Kachere Golf Course in Mtunthama. She was selected again in November as a forward by Lovemore Fazili to play for the national team in Lilongwe for the Three Nations Tournament.

=== Personal Bests ===
Event	Time	Date	Notes
100 meters	11.68	30 July 2021	NR
200 meters	22.91	25 June 2024	NR
400 meters	51.55	7 August 2022	NR

== Football career ==
=== Club career ===
Simwaka has played for Topik in Malawi.

=== International career ===
Simwaka capped for Malawi at senior level during three COSAFA Women's Championship editions (2019, 2020 and 2021).

She competed in the Commonwealth Games in Glasgow. She was also chosen to be in Lovemore Fazili's squad who went to Morocco in August 2026. They beat Algeria to qualify for the 2026 Women's Africa Cup of Nations (Wafcon) final. During that match she and Chikondi Gondwe were replaced by Vanessa Chikupila and Leticia Chinyamula after each side was down to ten players. Malawi won the match 3–1.

Olympic Games
Preceded by Areneo David; Jessica Makwenda	Flag bearer for Malawi; Paris 2024 with Filipe Gomes	Succeeded by Incumbent
