= Francis Munthali =

Malawian middle-distance runner

Francis Fanello Munthali
Personal information
- Nationality: Malawian
- Born: 25 December 1972 (age 53)
- Height: 1.70 m (5 ft 7 in)
- Weight: 58 kg (128 lb)

Sport
- Sport: Middle-distance running
- Event: Marathon

Francis Fanello Munthali (born 25 December 1972) is a Malawian former middle-distance runner.

Competing in the men's 800 metres at the 1992 Summer Olympics in Barcelona, Francis finished eighth in heat eight and failed to qualify for the next round. At the 2000 Summer Olympics, he ran in the men's 1500 metres, finishing last in heat one and setting a new national record with a time of 3:46.34. Munthali also featured in both the 1998 and 2002 Commonwealth Games, covering distances from 1500 metres up to the marathon.

He played his part in representing Malawi at different editions of the Olympics. His performances were not the best but he set new standards for his Nation by breaking the National record.

After retiring from competitive sports, Francis became the national athletics coach for Malawi.

Olympic Games
Preceded by John Mwathiwa	Flagbearer for Malawi; 2000 Sydney	Succeeded by Kondwani Chiwina
