= Olympic and Commonwealth Games Association of Malawi =

National Olympic Committee

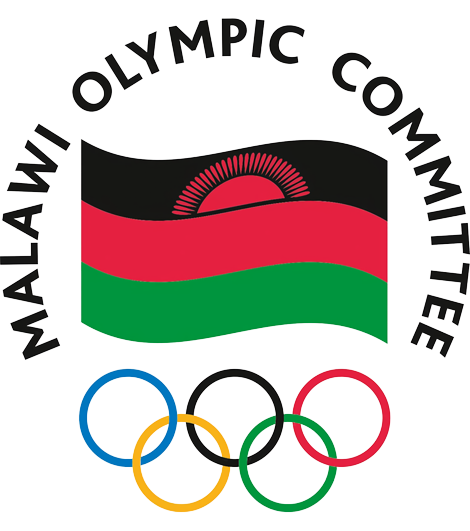
- Country: Malawi
- Code: MAW
- Created: 1968
- Recognized: 1968
- Continental Association: ANOCA
- President: Jappie Mhango
- Secretary General: Captain John Kaputa RTD
- Website: www.moc.org.mw

The Olympic and Commonwealth Games Association of Malawi (IOC code: MAW) is the National Olympic Committee representing Malawi and responsible for Olympics and Commonwealth Games operations. It was founded and recognized by the IOC in 1968.

The organization is currently chaired by Jappie Mhango as its president and Captain John Kaputa RTD as its secretary general.

The Olympic and Commonwealth Games Association of Malawi is headquartered in Lilongwe, Malawi.

== See also ==
- Malawi at the Olympics
- Malawi at the Commonwealth Games
