= 1996 IAAF World Cross Country Championships – Junior women's race =

Junior women's race at the 1996 IAAF World Cross Country Championships
- Organisers: IAAF
- Edition: 24th
- Date: March 23
- Host city: Stellenbosch, Western Cape, South Africa
- Venue: Danie Craven Stadium
- Events: 1
- Distances: 4.22 km – Junior women
- Participation: 115 athletes from 30 nations

The Junior women's race at the 1996 IAAF World Cross Country Championships was held in Stellenbosch, South Africa, at the Danie Craven Stadium on March 23, 1996. A preview on the event was given in the Herald, and a report in The New York Times.

Complete results, medallists, and the results of British athletes were published.

== Race results ==
=== Junior women's race (4.22 km) ===
==== Individual ====
Rank	Athlete	Country	Time
1st place, gold medalist(s)	Kutre Dulecha	Ethiopia	13:27
2nd place, silver medalist(s)	Annemari Sandell	Finland	13:32
3rd place, bronze medalist(s)	Jepkorir Ayabei	Kenya	13:35
4	Nancy Kipron	Kenya	13:49
5	Edna Kiplagat	Kenya	13:50
6	Etaferahu Tarekegn	Ethiopia	13:53
7	Cristina Iloc	Romania	13:56
8	Shura Hotesa	Ethiopia	13:59
9	Elizabeth Cheptanui	Kenya	14:00
10	Caroline Tarus	Kenya	14:04
11	Ayelech Worku	Ethiopia	14:09
12	Sintayahu Fikre	Ethiopia	14:12
13	Iona Oltean	Romania	14:12
14	Zenebech Tadese	Ethiopia	14:15
15	Emiko Kojima	Japan	14:16
16	Yuka Hata	Japan	14:18
17	Tomoko Hashimoto	Japan	14:21
18	Sun Guanghong	China	14:23
19	Charlotte Audier	France	14:26
20	Christine Nichols	United States	14:27
21	Olivera Jevtić	FR Yugoslavia	14:30
22	Kaori Yoshimura	Japan	14:31
23	Evelyne Coussement	Belgium	14:31
24	Bouchra Benthami	Morocco	14:33
25	Courtney Pugmire	United States	14:34
26	Anita Weyermann	Switzerland	14:36
27	Ileana Dorca	Romania	14:38
28	Svetlana Berdysheva	Russia	14:39
29	Judit Plá	Spain	14:40
30	Sara Ferrari	Italy	14:41
31	Iuliana Istin	Romania	14:41
32	Jennifer Handley	Canada	14:41
33	Georgina Fourie	South Africa	14:42
34	René Kalmer	South Africa	14:42
35	Silvia Montane	Spain	14:45
36	Sunita Rani	India	14:45
37	Marie Davis	United States	14:45
38	Alessandra Aguilar	Spain	14:46
39	Anikó Kálovics	Hungary	14:46
40	Bertha Sánchez	Colombia	14:51
41	Katherine Radkewich	United States	14:52
42	Katalin Szentgyörgyi	Hungary	14:53
43	Letiwe Marakurwa	Zimbabwe	14:53
44	Vanessa Galan	Spain	14:54
45	Andrea Johnson	Canada	14:54
46	Fabiane Cristine da Silva	Brazil	14:57
47	Sonja Knöpfli	Switzerland	15:00
48	Li Meihua	China	15:01
49	Desiree Kruger	South Africa	15:03
50	Laura Réal	Spain	15:04
51	Tanya Povey	United Kingdom	15:05
52	Natallia Kvachuk	Belarus	15:11
53	Michelle Mann	United Kingdom	15:12
54	Manuela Dominguez	Spain	15:12
55	Daphne Panhuijsen	Netherlands	15:12
56	Mirela Gavrila	Romania	15:13
57	Ngwarai Mapepa	Zimbabwe	15:13
58	Stephanie van Graan	South Africa	15:13
59	Letitsia Mubamarwo	Zimbabwe	15:14
60	Tifenn le Page	France	15:14
61	Xu Lihong	China	15:15
62	Katie McGregor	United States	15:19
63	Emi Kato	Japan	15:20
64	Ayumi Iwashita	Japan	15:20
65	Hanan Najih	France	15:22
66	Paima de Leo	Italy	15:25
67	Albina Ivanova	Russia	15:26
68	Jackie Coscia	United States	15:26
69	Lada Brazdilová	Czech Republic	15:28
70	Clothilde Gélin	France	15:29
71	Monica Martel	Mexico	15:30
72	Cristina Soflau	Romania	15:32
73	Sithembila Ndhlovu	Zimbabwe	15:33
74	Johanna Risku	Finland	15:34
75	Juliette Oldfield	United Kingdom	15:35
76	Carmen Douma	Canada	15:35
77	Sharolyn Shields	Canada	15:37
78	Elisabeta Fonseca	Portugal	15:38
79	Natascia Morichetti	Italy	15:38
80	Isabel Boldo	Brazil	15:41
81	Yekaterina Bogatyreva	Russia	15:42
82	Jane Groves	United Kingdom	15:42
83	Louisa Leballo	South Africa	15:47
84	Martina Malquori	Italy	15:47
85	Paulina Rath	Netherlands	15:48
86	Gloria Foronda	Colombia	15:51
87	Jacqueline Toniolo	Italy	15:53
88	Ana Rondón	Colombia	15:54
89	Marilyn Maheux	Canada	15:56
90	Yelena Tolstygina	Belarus	16:01
91	Helen van Lysebetten	Belgium	16:01
92	Lizette Grobler	South Africa	16:02
93	Guenaelle Gardel	France	16:06
94	Christelle Charpentier	France	16:06
95	Elena Bonanno	Italy	16:07
96	Nathalie van Hoorebeke	Belgium	16:10
97	Francine Darroch	Canada	16:19
98	Johanna Raja-aho	Finland	16:26
99	Irina Kosolapova	Russia	16:26
100	Michelle Costa	Brazil	16:30
101	Jelena Korol	Belarus	16:31
102	Luz Rojas	Colombia	16:37
103	Marja Loukkola	Finland	16:46
104	An Gommers	Belgium	16:49
105	Madhuri Gurnule	India	16:49
106	Singasi Dube	Zimbabwe	16:58
107	Kristina Topic	Croatia	17:10
108	Florencia Vicente	Mozambique	17:56
109	Érica dos Santos	Brazil	18:14
110	Cecilia David	Mozambique	18:25
—	Marina Yushkevich	Belarus	DNF
—	Sheila Fairweather	United Kingdom	DNF
—	Krista Ranta-Pere	Finland	DQ^{†}
—	Savita Birajdar	India	DQ^{†}
—	Lakshmaiah Manjula	India	DQ^{†}

^{†}: Krista Ranta-Pere of Finland came in 90th in 16:00 min, Savita Birajdar of India 98th in 16:12 min, and Lakshmaiah Manjula of India 99th in 16:16 min, but all three were disqualified.

==== Teams ====
Rank	Team	Points
1st place, gold medalist(s)	Kenya: Jepkorir Ayabei / 3; Nancy Kipron / 4; Edna Kiplagat / 5; Elizabeth Cheptanui / 9; (Caroline Tarus) / (10)	21
2nd place, silver medalist(s)	Ethiopia: Kutre Dulecha / 1; Etaferahu Tarekegn / 6; Shura Hotesa / 8; Ayelech Worku / 11; (Sintayahu Fikre) / (12); (Zenebech Tadese) / (14)	26
3rd place, bronze medalist(s)	Japan: Emiko Kojima / 15; Yuka Hata / 16; Tomoko Hashimoto / 17; Kaori Yoshimura / 22; (Emi Kato) / (63); (Ayumi Iwashita) / (64)	70
4	Romania: Cristina Iloc / 7; Iona Oltean / 13; Ileana Dorca / 27; Iuliana Istin / 31; (Mirela Gavrila) / (56); (Cristina Soflau) / (72)	78
5	United States: Christine Nichols / 20; Courtney Pugmire / 25; Marie Davis / 37; Katherine Radkewich / 41; (Katie McGregor) / (62); (Jackie Coscia) / (68)	123
6	Spain: Judit Plá / 29; Silvia Montane / 35; Alessandra Aguilar / 38; Vanessa Galan / 44; (Laura Réal) / (50); (Manuela Dominguez) / (54)	146
7	South Africa: Georgina Fourie / 33; René Kalmer / 34; Desiree Kruger / 49; Stephanie van Graan / 58; (Louisa Leballo) / (83); (Lizette Grobler) / (92)	174
8	France: Charlotte Audier / 19; Tifenn le Page / 60; Hanan Najih / 65; Clothilde Gélin / 70; (Guenaelle Gardel) / (93); (Christelle Charpentier) / (94)	214
9	Canada: Jennifer Handley / 32; Andrea Johnson / 45; Carmen Douma / 76; Sharolyn Shields / 77; (Marilyn Maheux) / (89); (Francine Darroch) / (97)	230
10	Zimbabwe: Letiwe Marakurwa / 43; Ngwarai Mapepa / 57; Letitsia Mubamarwo / 59; Sithembila Ndhlovu / 73; (Singasi Dube) / (106)	232
11	Italy: Sara Ferrari / 30; Paima de Leo / 66; Natascia Morichetti / 79; Martina Malquori / 84; (Jacqueline Toniolo) / (87); (Elena Bonanno) / (95)	259
12	United Kingdom: Tanya Povey / 51; Michelle Mann / 53; Juliette Oldfield / 75; Jane Groves / 82; (Sheila Fairweather) / (DNF)	261
13	Russia: Svetlana Berdysheva / 28; Albina Ivanova / 67; Yekaterina Bogatyreva / 81; Irina Kosolapova / 99	275
14	Finland: Annemari Sandell / 2; Johanna Risku / 74; Johanna Raja-aho / 98; Marja Loukkola / 103	277
15	Belgium: Evelyne Coussement / 23; Helen van Lysebetten / 91; Nathalie van Hoorebeke / 96; An Gommers / 104	314
16	Colombia: Bertha Sánchez / 40; Gloria Foronda / 86; Ana Rondón / 88; Luz Rojas / 102	316
17	Brazil: Fabiane Cristine da Silva / 46; Isabel Boldo / 80; Michelle Costa / 100; Érica dos Santos / 109	335
DNF	Belarus: (Natallia Kvachuk) / (52); (Yelena Tolstygina) / (90); (Jelena Korol) / (101); (Marina Yushkevich) / (DNF)	DNF
DQ	India: (Sunita Rani) / (36); (Madhuri Gurnule) / (105); (Lakshmaiah Manjula) / (DQ); (Savita Birajdar) / (DQ)	DQ

- Note: Athletes in parentheses did not score for the team result

== Participation ==
An unofficial count yields the participation of 115 athletes from 30 countries in the Junior women's race. This is in agreement with the official numbers as published.

- Belarus (4)
- Belgium (4)
- Brazil (4)
- Canada (6)
- China (3)
- Colombia (4)
- Croatia (1)
- Czech Republic (1)
- Ethiopia (6)
- Finland (5)
- France (6)
- Hungary (2)
- India (4)
- Italy (6)
- Japan (6)
- Kenya (5)
- Mexico (1)
- Morocco (1)
- Mozambique (2)
- Netherlands (2)
- Portugal (1)
- Romania (6)
- Russia (4)
- South Africa (6)
- Spain (6)
- Switzerland (2)
- United Kingdom (5)
- United States (6)
- FR Yugoslavia (1)
- Zimbabwe (5)

== See also ==
- 1996 IAAF World Cross Country Championships – Senior men's race
- 1996 IAAF World Cross Country Championships – Junior men's race
- 1996 IAAF World Cross Country Championships – Senior women's race
