= 1995 IAAF World Cross Country Championships – Junior men's race =

Junior men's race at the 1995 IAAF World Cross Country Championships
- Organisers: IAAF
- Edition: 23rd
- Date: March 25
- Host city: Durham, County Durham, United Kingdom
- Venue: University of Durham
- Events: 1
- Distances: 8.47 km – Junior men
- Participation: 148 athletes from 43 nations

The Junior men's race at the 1995 IAAF World Cross Country Championships was held in Durham, United Kingdom, at the University of Durham on March 25, 1995. A report on the event was given in The New York Times and in the Herald.

Complete results, medallists, and the results of British athletes were published.

== Race results ==
=== Junior men's race (8.47 km) ===
==== Individual ====
Rank	Athlete	Country	Time
1st place, gold medalist(s)	Assefa Mezegebu	Ethiopia	24:12
2nd place, silver medalist(s)	Dejene Lidetu	Ethiopia	24:14
3rd place, bronze medalist(s)	David Chelule	Kenya	24:16
4	Andrew Panga	Tanzania	24:19
5	Philip Mosima	Kenya	24:23
6	Abreham Tsige	Ethiopia	24:40
7	Hezron Otwori	Kenya	24:43
8	Mark Bett	Kenya	24:48
9	Sammy Kipruto	Kenya	24:58
10	Christopher Kelong	Kenya	25:02
11	John Morapedi	South Africa	25:04
12	Marko Hwahu	Tanzania	25:04
13	Hideaki Haraguchi	Japan	25:09
14	Benoît Zwierzchiewski	France	25:10
15	Mohamed El Hattab	Morocco	25:14
16	Lemma Bonsa	Ethiopia	25:19
17	Mohamed Amyn	Morocco	25:22
18	Iván Pérez	Spain	25:24
19	Abderrahman Chmaiti	Morocco	25:26
20	Muneyuki Ojima	Japan	25:27
21	Abdelilah El Marrafe	Morocco	25:29
22	Shinji Yamazaki	Japan	25:30
23	Mizan Mehari	Ethiopia	25:36
24	Baha Tulumbo	Tanzania	25:38
25	Abderrahim Goumri	Morocco	25:47
26	Gunther Methot	Belgium	25:49
27	Grigoriy Generalov	Russia	25:54
28	Gert-Jan Liefers	Netherlands	25:54
29	Akira Kiniwa	Japan	25:57
30	Mohamed Awol	Ethiopia	25:57
31	Miloud Abaoub	Algeria	26:00
32	Salem Messaoui	Algeria	26:02
33	Meck Mothuli	South Africa	26:02
34	Badre din Zioini	France	26:06
35	Tim Briggs	United States	26:08
36	José Antonio Ramallo	Spain	26:10
37	Abdelghani Amraoui	Algeria	26:11
38	Ahmed Ezzobayry	Morocco	26:15
39	Mauricio Ladino	Colombia	26:16
40	Hiroyuki Ogawa	Japan	26:16
41	Viktor Golubev	Belarus	26:16
42	Sun Jiawei	China	26:17
43	Petros Sithole	South Africa	26:22
44	Juan José Gómez	Spain	26:23
45	André Bucher	Switzerland	26:26
46	Matt Kerr	Canada	26:26
47	Abdulaziz Abdulrahman	Yemen	26:27
48	Alexandr Gelesh	Ukraine	26:27
49	Jason Rexing	United States	26:28
50	Lyes Ramoul	Algeria	26:29
51	Malte Stern	Germany	26:30
52	Dalibor Balgac	Croatia	26:31
53	Clodoaldo da Silva	Brazil	26:32
54	Adrian Maghiar	Romania	26:33
55	Antonio da Fonseca	Portugal	26:34
56	Noriyoshi Takasu	Japan	26:34
57	Pieter van Thournhout	Belgium	26:35
58	Márcio da Silva	Brazil	26:36
59	Kamel Boulahfane	Algeria	26:37
60	Michael Vicedo	France	26:38
61	Ali Harezi Al-Ghazali	Yemen	26:39
62	Aleksey Shestakov	Kazakhstan	26:39
63	Khaled Al-Atashi	Yemen	26:40
64	Travis Landreth	United States	26:42
65	Damiano Polti	Italy	26:44
66	Iván Hierro	Spain	26:45
67	Allen Graffin	United Kingdom	26:46
68	Clinton Mackevicius	Australia	26:46
69	Aaron Gabonewe	South Africa	26:47
70	Richard Mncwabe	South Africa	26:48
71	Aleksandr Lukoshenko	Belarus	26:49
72	Chad Walton	Canada	26:49
73	Aleksey Lopaticuk	Ukraine	26:51
74	Sébastien Boiton	France	26:53
75	Martin Brusak	Czech Republic	26:54
76	Tony Forrest	United Kingdom	26:54
77	Janko Bensa	Yugoslavia	26:55
78	Davide Becchio	Italy	26:55
79	Matt Farley	United States	26:56
80	Luca Rosa	Italy	26:57
81	Mark Hauser	United States	26:58
82	Klaus Mueller	Canada	27:01
83	Ephraim Mokhotu	South Africa	27:03
84	Jerry Ziak	Canada	27:04
85	Matt O'Dowd	United Kingdom	27:04
86	Lahcene Slimani	Algeria	27:04
87	Alexandr Mulin	Ukraine	27:05
88	Marilson dos Santos	Brazil	27:06
89	Esa Martomaa	Finland	27:07
90	Fouad Obad	Yemen	27:08
91	Paw Nielsen	Denmark	27:08
92	Ben Reese	United Kingdom	27:10
93	Davide Maffei	Italy	27:11
94	Mohamed Al-Khawlani	Yemen	27:11
95	Gábor Domonyik	Hungary	27:12
96	Eduardo Vargas	Spain	27:13
97	Reynald Moulet	France	27:14
98	Bart de Berge	Belgium	27:14
99	Brian Jensen	Denmark	27:15
100	Nicki Olesen	Denmark	27:17
101	Menisan Sanbato	Israel	27:21
102	Ruslan Sukhodolskiy	Moldova	27:22
103	Bart Verkaemer	Belgium	27:27
104	Frank Hoffmeister	Germany	27:29
105	Michael Maechler	Switzerland	27:30
106	José Carrasco	Colombia	27:31
107	Robert Brown	United Kingdom	27:36
108	Ndara Petrus	Namibia	27:37
109	Nico Noe	Belgium	27:38
110	Emanuele Manzi	Italy	27:39
111	Mikhail Potylchak	Belarus	27:39
112	Lars Juhl	Denmark	27:41
113	Chris Severy	United States	27:42
114	Gabriele Valli	Italy	27:45
115	András Juhász	Hungary	27:48
116	Ricardo Santos	Canada	27:50
117	Seppo Simola	Finland	27:51
118	Paulo Lunkes	Brazil	27:53
119	Vitaliy Zhogalskiy	Belarus	27:54
120	Valery Shugayevskiy	Ukraine	27:55
121	László Farkas	Hungary	27:56
122	Juvenal Vásquez	Colombia	28:00
123	Steve Lawrence	Canada	28:11
124	Jeroen van Dijke	Netherlands	28:12
125	Abdelatif Jlil	France	28:25
126	Philipp Nawrocki	Germany	28:29
127	Matthias Weippert	Germany	28:38
128	Nathaniel Lane	United Kingdom	28:46
129	Destao Sevannek	Israel	28:49
130	Denis Simicic	Croatia	28:53
131	Amadou Camara	Sierra Leone	28:55
132	Marck Lanham	Australia	29:05
133	Béla Horváth	Hungary	29:10
134	Kevin Musseliah	Mauritius	29:11
135	Kemal Tuvakuliyev	Turkmenistan	29:19
136	Jurica Posavec	Croatia	29:29
137	Kreso Baric	Croatia	29:42
138	Jhon Beltran	Colombia	29:45
139	Nikolay Volkov	Uzbekistan	29:51
140	Nicolas Natchou	Mauritius	29:57
141	Wang Ping-Chia	Chinese Taipei	29:58
142	Selwyn Bonne	Seychelles	30:36
143	Denis Sorokin	Uzbekistan	31:38
144	Roy Delorie	Seychelles	32:05
145	Nelson Hurst	Seychelles	33:15
146	Jude Bacharie	Seychelles	35:09
—	Reyes Estévez	Spain	DNF
—	Rui Silva	Portugal	DNF

==== Teams ====
Rank	Team	Points
1st place, gold medalist(s)	Kenya: David Chelule / 3; Philip Mosima / 5; Hezron Otwori / 7; Mark Bett / 8; (Sammy Kipruto) / (9); (Christopher Kelong) / (10)	23
2nd place, silver medalist(s)	Ethiopia: Assefa Mezegebu / 1; Dejene Lidetu / 2; Abreham Tsige / 6; Lemma Bonsa / 16; (Mizan Mehari) / (23); (Mohamed Awol) / (30)	25
3rd place, bronze medalist(s)	Morocco: Mohamed El Hattab / 15; Mohamed Amyn / 17; Abderrahman Chmaiti / 19; Abdelilah El Marrafe / 21; (Abderrahim Goumri) / (25); (Ahmed Ezzobayry) / (38)	72
4	Japan: Hideaki Haraguchi / 13; Muneyuki Ojima / 20; Shinji Yamazaki / 22; Akira Kiniwa / 29; (Hiroyuki Ogawa) / (40); (Noriyoshi Takasu) / (56)	84
5	Algeria: Miloud Abaoub / 31; Salem Messaoui / 32; Abdelghani Amraoui / 37; Lyes Ramoul / 50; (Kamel Boulahfane) / (59); (Lahcene Slimani) / (86)	150
6	South Africa: John Morapedi / 11; Meck Mothuli / 33; Petros Sithole / 43; Aaron Gabonewe / 69; (Richard Mncwabe) / (70); (Ephraim Mokhotu) / (83)	156
7	Spain: Iván Pérez / 18; José Antonio Ramallo / 36; Juan José Gómez / 44; Iván Hierro / 66; (Eduardo Vargas) / (96); (Reyes Estévez) / (DNF)	164
8	France: Benoît Zwierzchiewski / 14; Badre din Zioini / 34; Michael Vicedo / 60; Sébastien Boiton / 74; (Reynald Moulet) / (97); (Abdelatif Jlil) / (125)	182
9	United States: Tim Briggs / 35; Jason Rexing / 49; Travis Landreth / 64; Matt Farley / 79; (Mark Hauser) / (81); (Chris Severy) / (113)	227
10	Yemen: Abdulaziz Abdulrahman / 47; Ali Harezi Al-Ghazali / 61; Khaled Al-Atashi / 63; Fouad Obad / 90; (Mohamed Al-Khawlani) / (94)	261
11	Canada: Matt Kerr / 46; Chad Walton / 72; Klaus Mueller / 82; Jerry Ziak / 84; (Ricardo Santos) / (116); (Steve Lawrence) / (123)	284
12	Belgium: Gunther Methot / 26; Pieter van Thournhout / 57; Bart de Berge / 98; Bart Verkaemer / 103; (Nico Noe) / (109)	284
13	Italy: Damiano Polti / 65; Davide Becchio / 78; Luca Rosa / 80; Davide Maffei / 93; (Emanuele Manzi) / (110); (Gabriele Valli) / (114)	316
14	Brazil: Clodoaldo da Silva / 53; Márcio da Silva / 58; Marilson dos Santos / 88; Paulo Lunkes / 118	317
15	United Kingdom: Allen Graffin / 67; Tony Forrest / 76; Matt O'Dowd / 85; Ben Reese / 92; (Robert Brown) / (107); (Nathaniel Lane) / (128)	320
16	Ukraine: Alexandr Gelesh / 48; Aleksey Lopaticuk / 73; Alexandr Mulin / 87; Valery Shugayevskiy / 120	328
17	Belarus: Viktor Golubev / 41; Aleksandr Lukoshenko / 71; Mikhail Potylchak / 111; Vitaliy Zhogalskiy / 119	342
18	Denmark: Paw Nielsen / 91; Brian Jensen / 99; Nicki Olesen / 100; Lars Juhl / 112	402
19	Colombia: Mauricio Ladino / 39; José Carrasco / 106; Juvenal Vásquez / 122; Jhon Beltran / 138	405
20	Germany: Malte Stern / 51; Frank Hoffmeister / 104; Philipp Nawrocki / 126; Matthias Weippert / 127	408
21	Croatia: Dalibor Balgac / 52; Denis Simicic / 130; Jurica Posavec / 136; Kreso Baric / 137	455
22	Hungary: Gábor Domonyik / 95; András Juhász / 115; László Farkas / 121; Béla Horváth / 133	464
23	Seychelles: Selwyn Bonne / 142; Roy Delorie / 144; Nelson Hurst / 145; Jude Bacharie / 146	577

- Note: Athletes in parentheses did not score for the team result

== Participation ==
An unofficial count yields the participation of 148 athletes from 43 countries in the Junior men's race. This is in agreement with the official numbers as published.

- Algeria (6)
- Australia (2)
- Belarus (4)
- Belgium (5)
- Brazil (4)
- Canada (6)
- China (1)
- Chinese Taipei (1)
- Colombia (4)
- Croatia (4)
- Czech Republic (1)
- Denmark (4)
- Ethiopia (6)
- Finland (2)
- France (6)
- Germany (4)
- Hungary (4)
- Israel (2)
- Italy (6)
- Japan (6)
- Kazakhstan (1)
- Kenya (6)
- Mauritius (2)
- Moldova (1)
- Morocco (6)
- Namibia (1)
- Netherlands (2)
- Portugal (2)
- Romania (1)
- Russia (1)
- Seychelles (4)
- Sierra Leone (1)
- South Africa (6)
- Spain (6)
- Switzerland (2)
- Tanzania (3)
- Turkmenistan (1)
- Ukraine (4)
- United Kingdom (6)
- United States (6)
- Uzbekistan (2)
- Yemen (5)
- Yugoslavia (1)

== See also ==
- 1995 IAAF World Cross Country Championships – Senior men's race
- 1995 IAAF World Cross Country Championships – Senior women's race
- 1995 IAAF World Cross Country Championships – Junior women's race
