= 1995 IAAF World Cross Country Championships =

- Organisers: IAAF
- Edition: 23rd
- Date: 25 March
- Host city: Durham, County Durham, United Kingdom
- Venue: Maiden Castle sports centre, University of Durham
- Events: 4
- Distances: 12.02 km – Senior men 8.47 km – Junior men 6.47 km – Senior women 4.47 km – Junior women
- Participation: 619 athletes from 58 nations

The 1995 IAAF World Cross Country Championships was held in Durham, United Kingdom, at the University of Durham on 25 March 1995. A report on the event was given in The New York Times and in the Herald.

Complete results for senior men, junior men, senior women, junior women, medallists, and the results of British athletes were published.

== Medallists ==
Event	Gold		Silver		Bronze	
Individual
Senior men (12.02 km)	Paul Tergat; Kenya	34:05	Ismael Kirui; Kenya	34:13	Salah Hissou; Morocco	34:14
Junior men (8.47 km)	Assefa Mezegebu; Ethiopia	24:12	Dejene Lidetu; Ethiopia	24:14	David Chelule; Kenya	24:16
Senior women (6.47 km)	Derartu Tulu; Ethiopia	20:21	Catherina McKiernan; Ireland	20:29	Sally Barsosio; Kenya	20:39
Junior women (4.47 km)	Annemari Sandell; Finland	14:04	Jebiwot Keitany; Kenya	14:09	Nancy Kipron; Kenya	14:17
Team
Senior men	Kenya	62	Morocco	111	Spain	120
Junior men	Kenya	23	Ethiopia	25	Morocco	72
Senior women	Kenya	26	Ethiopia	38	Romania	84
Junior women	Kenya	18	Ethiopia	31	Japan	56

== Race results ==
=== Senior men's race (12.02 km) ===
Individual race
Rank	Athlete	Country	Time
1st place, gold medalist(s)	Paul Tergat	Kenya	34:05
2nd place, silver medalist(s)	Ismael Kirui	Kenya	34:13
3rd place, bronze medalist(s)	Salah Hissou	Morocco	34:14
4	Haile Gebrselassie	Ethiopia	34:26
5	Brahim Lahlafi	Morocco	34:34
6	Paulo Guerra	Portugal	34:38
7	James Songok	Kenya	34:41
8	Simon Chemoiywo	Kenya	34:46
9	Todd Williams	United States	34:47
10	Martín Fiz	Spain	34:50
11	Elarbi Khattabi	Morocco	34:55
12	Abdelaziz Sahere	Morocco	35:00
Full results

Teams
Rank	Team	Points
1st place, gold medalist(s)	Kenya: Paul Tergat / 1; Ismael Kirui / 2; James Songok / 7; Simon Chemoiywo / 8; Julius Ondieki / 15; William Kiptum / 29; (Simeon Rono) / (30); (Gideon Chirchir) / (67); (Dominic Kirui) / (142)	62
2nd place, silver medalist(s)	Morocco: Salah Hissou / 3; Brahim Lahlafi / 5; Elarbi Khattabi / 11; Abdelaziz Sahere / 12; Hammou Boutayeb / 39; Mustapha Bamouh / 41; (Abderrahim Zitouna) / (76); (Larbi Zéroual) / (DNF)	111
3rd place, bronze medalist(s)	Spain: Martín Fiz / 10; José Manuel García / 13; José Carlos Adán / 18; Antonio Serrano / 19; Alejandro Gómez / 28; Antonio Pérez / 32; (Julio Rey) / (36); (Bartolomé Serrano) / (48); (Abel Antón) / (78)	120
4	Portugal	139
5	Ethiopia	169
6	United States	310
7	Italy	325
8	South Africa	326
Full results

- Note: Athletes in parentheses did not score for the team result

=== Junior men's race (8.47 km) ===
Individual race
Rank	Athlete	Country	Time
1st place, gold medalist(s)	Assefa Mezegebu	Ethiopia	24:12
2nd place, silver medalist(s)	Dejene Lidetu	Ethiopia	24:14
3rd place, bronze medalist(s)	David Chelule	Kenya	24:16
4	Andrew Panga	Tanzania	24:19
5	Philip Mosima	Kenya	24:23
6	Abreham Tsige	Ethiopia	24:40
7	Hezron Otwori	Kenya	24:43
8	Mark Bett	Kenya	24:48
9	Sammy Kipruto	Kenya	24:58
10	Christopher Kelong	Kenya	25:02
11	John Morapedi	South Africa	25:04
12	Marko Hwahu	Tanzania	25:04
Full results

Teams
Rank	Team	Points
1st place, gold medalist(s)	Kenya: David Chelule / 3; Philip Mosima / 5; Hezron Otwori / 7; Mark Bett / 8; (Sammy Kipruto) / (9); (Christopher Kelong) / (10)	23
2nd place, silver medalist(s)	Ethiopia: Assefa Mezegebu / 1; Dejene Lidetu / 2; Abreham Tsige / 6; Lemma Bonsa / 16; (Mizan Mehari) / (23); (Mohamed Awol) / (30)	25
3rd place, bronze medalist(s)	Morocco: Mohamed El Hattab / 15; Mohamed Amyn / 17; Abderrahman Chmaiti / 19; Abdelilah El Marrafe / 21; (Abderrahim Goumri) / (25); (Ahmed Ezzobayry) / (38)	72
4	Japan	84
5	Algeria	150
6	South Africa	156
7	Spain	164
8	France	182
Full results

- Note: Athletes in parentheses did not score for the team result

=== Senior women's race (6.47 km) ===
Individual race
Rank	Athlete	Country	Time
1st place, gold medalist(s)	Derartu Tulu	Ethiopia	20:21
2nd place, silver medalist(s)	Catherina McKiernan	Ireland	20:29
3rd place, bronze medalist(s)	Sally Barsosio	Kenya	20:39
4	Margaret Ngotho	Kenya	20:40
5	Gete Wami	Ethiopia	20:49
6	Joan Nesbit	United States	20:50
7	Merima Denboba	Ethiopia	20:53
8	Rose Cheruiyot	Kenya	20:54
9	Albertina Dias	Portugal	20:56
10	Gabriela Szabo	Romania	20:57
11	Catherine Kirui	Kenya	20:58
12	Zahra Ouaziz	Morocco	21:06
Full results

Teams
Rank	Team	Points
1st place, gold medalist(s)	Kenya: Sally Barsosio / 3; Margaret Ngotho / 4; Rose Cheruiyot / 8; Catherine Kirui / 11; (Hellen Kimaiyo) / (17); (Hellen Chepngeno) / (27)	26
2nd place, silver medalist(s)	Ethiopia: Derartu Tulu / 1; Gete Wami / 5; Merima Denboba / 7; Askale Bereda / 25; (Genet Gebregiorgis) / (26); (Getenesh Urge) / (77)	38
3rd place, bronze medalist(s)	Romania: Gabriela Szabo / 10; Tudorita Chidu / 22; Elena Fidatof / 23; Iulia Negura / 29; (Cristina Misaros) / (30); (Daniela Bran) / (85)	84
4	Japan	102
5	United States	111
6	Russia	116
7	Spain	133
8	France	151
Full results

- Note: Athletes in parentheses did not score for the team result

=== Junior women's race (4.47 km) ===
Individual race
Rank	Athlete	Country	Time
1st place, gold medalist(s)	Annemari Sandell	Finland	14:04
2nd place, silver medalist(s)	Jebiwot Keitany	Kenya	14:09
3rd place, bronze medalist(s)	Nancy Kipron	Kenya	14:17
4	Jepkorir Ayabei	Kenya	14:21
5	Birhan Dagne	Ethiopia	14:25
6	Anita Weyermann	Switzerland	14:25
7	Alemitu Bekele	Ethiopia	14:26
8	Yimenashu Taye	Ethiopia	14:27
9	Elizabeth Cheptanui	Kenya	14:28
10	Pamela Chepchumba	Kenya	14:31
11	Ayelech Worku	Ethiopia	14:33
12	Chiemi Takahashi	Japan	14:39
Full results

Teams
Rank	Team	Points
1st place, gold medalist(s)	Kenya: Jebiwot Keitany / 2; Nancy Kipron / 3; Jepkorir Ayabei / 4; Elizabeth Cheptanui / 9; (Pamela Chepchumba) / (10); (Helen Kimutai) / (14)	18
2nd place, silver medalist(s)	Ethiopia: Birhan Dagne / 5; Alemitu Bekele / 7; Yimenashu Taye / 8; Ayelech Worku / 11; (Getenesh Tamirat) / (18)	31
3rd place, bronze medalist(s)	Japan: Chiemi Takahashi / 12; Miwa Sugawara / 13; Yoshiko Ichikawa / 15; Masako Chiba / 16; (Ari Ichihashi) / (21); (Taeko Igarashi) / (23)	56
4	United States	113
5	Romania	120
6	United Kingdom	133
7	Spain	183
8	Belgium	208
Full results

- Note: Athletes in parentheses did not score for the team result

== Medal table (unofficial) ==
Rank	Nation	Gold	Silver	Bronze	Total
1	Kenya	5	2	3	10
2	Ethiopia	2	4	0	6
3	Finland	1	0	0	1
4	Morocco	0	1	2	3
5	Ireland	0	1	0	1
6	Japan	0	0	1	1
6	Romania	0	0	1	1
6	Spain	0	0	1	1
Totals (8 entries)		8	8	8	24

- Note: Totals include both individual and team medals, with medals in the team competition counting as one medal.

== Participation ==
An unofficial count yields the participation of 619 athletes from 58 countries. This is in agreement with the official numbers as published.

- Algeria (6)
- Australia (13)
- Belarus (6)
- Belgium (15)
- Botswana (7)
- Brazil (20)
- Canada (22)
- China (7)
- Chinese Taipei (4)
- Colombia (18)
- Croatia (8)
- Czech Republic (5)
- Denmark (7)
- Egypt (2)
- Ethiopia (27)
- Finland (5)
- France (27)
- Germany (6)
- Hong Kong (1)
- Hungary (6)
- Iceland (1)
- Ireland (13)
- Israel (3)
- Italy (27)
- Jamaica (6)
- Japan (20)
- Kazakhstan (8)
- Kenya (27)
- Kyrgyzstan (4)
- Lithuania (2)
- Malta (8)
- Mauritius (9)
- Moldova (2)
- Morocco (15)
- Namibia (3)
- Netherlands (12)
- New Zealand (5)
- Paraguay (1)
- Portugal (18)
- Puerto Rico (6)
- Romania (14)
- Russia (13)
- Seychelles (7)
- Sierra Leone (1)
- Slovakia (1)
- South Africa (27)
- Spain (27)
- Switzerland (10)
- Tanzania (10)
- Turkmenistan (4)
- Ukraine (18)
- United Kingdom (27)
- United States (27)
- Uzbekistan (7)
- Yemen (11)
- Yugoslavia (3)
- Zaire (1)
- Zimbabwe (9)

== See also ==
- 1995 IAAF World Cross Country Championships – Senior men's race
- 1995 IAAF World Cross Country Championships – Junior men's race
- 1995 IAAF World Cross Country Championships – Senior women's race
- 1995 IAAF World Cross Country Championships – Junior women's race
- 1995 in athletics (track and field)
