= 1995 IAAF World Cross Country Championships – Junior women's race =

Junior women's race at the 1995 IAAF World Cross Country Championships
- Organisers: IAAF
- Edition: 23rd
- Date: March 25
- Host city: Durham, County Durham, United Kingdom
- Venue: University of Durham
- Events: 1
- Distances: 4.47 km – Junior women
- Participation: 109 athletes from 33 nations

The Junior women's race at the 1995 IAAF World Cross Country Championships was held in Durham, England, at the University of Durham on March 25, 1995. A report on the event was given in The New York Times and in the Glasgow Herald.

Complete results, medallists, and the results of British athletes were published.

== Race results ==
=== Junior women's race (4.47 km) ===
==== Individual ====
Rank	Athlete	Country	Time
1st place, gold medalist(s)	Annemari Sandell	Finland	14:04
2nd place, silver medalist(s)	Jebiwot Keitany	Kenya	14:09
3rd place, bronze medalist(s)	Nancy Kipron	Kenya	14:17
4	Jepkorir Ayabei	Kenya	14:21
5	Birhan Dagne	Ethiopia	14:25
6	Anita Weyermann	Switzerland	14:25
7	Alemitu Bekele	Ethiopia	14:26
8	Yimenashu Taye	Ethiopia	14:27
9	Elizabeth Cheptanui	Kenya	14:28
10	Pamela Chepchumba	Kenya	14:31
11	Ayelech Worku	Ethiopia	14:33
12	Chiemi Takahashi	Japan	14:39
13	Miwa Sugawara	Japan	14:39
14	Helen Kimutai	Kenya	14:40
15	Yoshiko Ichikawa	Japan	14:42
16	Masako Chiba	Japan	14:44
17	Olivera Jevtić	FR Yugoslavia	14:55
18	Getenesh Tamirat	Ethiopia	14:57
19	Jessica Frye	United States	14:57
20	Alice Braham	United Kingdom	14:58
21	Ari Ichihashi	Japan	15:00
22	Ileana Dorca	Romania	15:00
23	Taeko Igarashi	Japan	15:01
24	Letiwe Marakurwa	Zimbabwe	15:02
25	Mary Cobb	United States	15:04
26	Esther Nherera	Zimbabwe	15:08
27	Nicola Slater	United Kingdom	15:08
28	Veerle van Linden	Belgium	15:14
29	Denisa Costescu	Romania	15:15
30	Beverley Gray	United Kingdom	15:15
31	Cristina Iloc	Romania	15:17
32	Julia Stamps	United States	15:17
33	Julie Fraud	Canada	15:18
34	Paula Hernandez	Spain	15:18
35	Elvira Longo	Spain	15:19
36	Katalin Szentgyörgyi	Hungary	15:20
37	Kortney Dunscombe	United States	15:20
38	Claudia Burca	Romania	15:21
39	Lyudmila Tarakanova	Russia	15:21
40	Yekaterina Bogatyreva	Russia	15:22
41	Bertha Sánchez	Colombia	15:23
42	Maria Sangeorzan	Romania	15:23
43	Sally Glynn	United States	15:25
44	Louisa Leballo	South Africa	15:26
45	Evelyne Coussement	Belgium	15:26
46	Oxsana Ishchuk	Ukraine	15:26
47	Lada Brazdilová	Czech Republic	15:27
48	Heather Burroughs	United States	15:27
49	Clothilde Gélin	France	15:29
50	Sara Ferrari	Italy	15:29
51	Georgina Fourie	South Africa	15:30
52	Stephanie van Graan	South Africa	15:31
53	Margaret Schotte	Canada	15:31
54	Iona Oltean	Romania	15:32
55	Silvia Montane	Spain	15:33
56	Heidi Moulder	United Kingdom	15:41
57	Sonja Knöpfli	Switzerland	15:43
58	Alison Outram	United Kingdom	15:44
59	Margarita Circujanu	Spain	15:45
60	Kate Inwood	New Zealand	15:45
61	Chipo Dzikiti	Zimbabwe	15:50
62	Elodie Olivares	France	15:51
63	Laura Réal	Spain	15:52
64	Sarah Speleers	Belgium	15:53
65	Fabiane Cristine da Silva	Brazil	15:54
66	Jennifer Newton	Canada	15:54
67	Mary Jane Richards	Canada	15:56
68	Manuela Dominguez	Spain	15:57
69	Constance Devillers	France	15:58
70	Tuelo Setswamorago	Botswana	16:01
71	Tessy Gorris	Belgium	16:02
72	Charlene Clements	South Africa	16:03
73	Andrea Johnson	Canada	16:06
74	Minette Jacobs	South Africa	16:07
75	Mirja Moser	Switzerland	16:08
76	Karima Charaallah	France	16:08
77	Heidi Comartin	Canada	16:09
78	Michelle Mann	United Kingdom	16:10
79	Irina Nedelenko	Ukraine	16:10
80	Svitlana Kemarska	Ukraine	16:12
81	Susanne Wehrli	Switzerland	16:12
82	Margoth Bonilla	Colombia	16:14
83	Claudia Pinna	Italy	16:14
84	Agnese Ananasso	Italy	16:15
85	Lubica Sedlaková	Slovakia	16:16
86	Oksana Ivashenko	Kazakhstan	16:19
87	Els Verthé	Belgium	16:20
88	Stella Métays	France	16:21
89	Chiang Chiu-Ting	Chinese Taipei	16:23
90	Erika Vivas	Colombia	16:26
91	Bruna Genovese	Italy	16:31
92	Ausilia Balletta	Italy	16:32
93	Kristina Topic	Croatia	16:36
94	Nora Reinerth	Germany	16:37
95	Nada Mellouck	France	16:42
96	Inge Smidt	South Africa	16:44
97	Nathalie Kuhn	Switzerland	16:45
98	Deborah dell'Andrino	Italy	16:47
99	Svetlana Sitnik	Kyrgyzstan	16:49
100	Helena Santos	Brazil	16:51
101	Isabel Boldo	Brazil	16:57
102	Maria de los a Lugo	Colombia	17:06
103	Anália Rosa	Portugal	17:09
104	Yelena Zaytseva	Uzbekistan	17:16
105	Eva Janssen	Netherlands	17:34
106	Ivancica Drugcevic	Croatia	17:34
107	Francislene da Silva	Brazil	18:00
—	Tatyana Stukalo	Ukraine	DNF
—	Etaferahu Tarekegn	Ethiopia	DQ

==== Teams ====
Rank	Team	Points
1st place, gold medalist(s)	Kenya: Jebiwot Keitany / 2; Nancy Kipron / 3; Jepkorir Ayabei / 4; Elizabeth Cheptanui / 9; (Pamela Chepchumba) / (10); (Helen Kimutai) / (14)	18
2nd place, silver medalist(s)	Ethiopia: Birhan Dagne / 5; Alemitu Bekele / 7; Yimenashu Taye / 8; Ayelech Worku / 11; (Getenesh Tamirat) / (18)	31
3rd place, bronze medalist(s)	Japan: Chiemi Takahashi / 12; Miwa Sugawara / 13; Yoshiko Ichikawa / 15; Masako Chiba / 16; (Ari Ichihashi) / (21); (Taeko Igarashi) / (23)	56
4	United States: Jessica Frye / 19; Mary Cobb / 25; Julia Stamps / 32; Kortney Dunscombe / 37; (Sally Glynn) / (43); (Heather Burroughs) / (48)	113
5	Romania: Ileana Dorca / 22; Denisa Costescu / 29; Cristina Iloc / 31; Claudia Burca / 38; (Maria Sangeorzan) / (42); (Iona Oltean) / (54)	120
6	United Kingdom: Alice Braham / 20; Nicola Slater / 27; Beverley Gray / 30; Heidi Moulder / 56; (Alison Outram) / (58); (Michelle Mann) / (78)	133
7	Spain: Paula Hernandez / 34; Elvira Longo / 35; Silvia Montane / 55; Margarita Circujanu / 59; (Laura Réal) / (63); (Manuela Dominguez) / (68)	183
8	Belgium: Veerle van Linden / 28; Evelyne Coussement / 45; Sarah Speleers / 64; Tessy Gorris / 71; (Els Verthé) / (87)	208
9	Canada: Julie Fraud / 33; Margaret Schotte / 53; Jennifer Newton / 66; Mary Jane Richards / 67; (Andrea Johnson) / (73); (Heidi Comartin) / (77)	219
10	South Africa: Louisa Leballo / 44; Georgina Fourie / 51; Stephanie van Graan / 52; Charlene Clements / 72; (Minette Jacobs) / (74); (Inge Smidt) / (96)	219
11	Switzerland: Anita Weyermann / 6; Sonja Knöpfli / 57; Mirja Moser / 75; Susanne Wehrli / 81; (Nathalie Kuhn) / (97)	219
12	France: Clothilde Gélin / 49; Elodie Olivares / 62; Constance Devillers / 69; Karima Charaallah / 76; (Stella Métays) / (88); (Nada Mellouck) / (95)	256
13	Italy: Sara Ferrari / 50; Claudia Pinna / 83; Agnese Ananasso / 84; Bruna Genovese / 91; (Ausilia Balletta) / (92); (Deborah dell'Andrino) / (98)	308
14	Colombia: Bertha Sánchez / 41; Margoth Bonilla / 82; Erika Vivas / 90; Maria de los a Lugo / 102	315
15	Brazil: Fabiane Cristine da Silva / 65; Helena Santos / 100; Isabel Boldo / 101; Francislene da Silva / 107	373
DNF	Ukraine: (Oxsana Ishchuk) / (46); (Irina Nedelenko) / (79); (Svitlana Kemarska) / (80); (Tatyana Stukalo) / (DNF)	DNF

- Note: Athletes in parentheses did not score for the team result

== Participation ==
An unofficial count yields the participation of 108 athletes from 33 countries in the Junior women's race. This is in agreement with the official numbers as published.

- Belgium (5)
- Botswana (1)
- Brazil (4)
- Canada (6)
- Chinese Taipei (1)
- Colombia (4)
- Croatia (2)
- Czech Republic (1)
- Ethiopia (6)
- Finland (1)
- France (6)
- Germany (1)
- Hungary (1)
- Italy (6)
- Japan (6)
- Kazakhstan (1)
- Kenya (6)
- Kyrgyzstan (1)
- Netherlands (1)
- New Zealand (1)
- Portugal (1)
- Romania (6)
- Russia (2)
- Slovakia (1)
- South Africa (6)
- Spain (6)
- Switzerland (5)
- Ukraine (4)
- United Kingdom (6)
- United States (6)
- Uzbekistan (1)
- FR Yugoslavia (1)
- Zimbabwe (3)

== See also ==
- 1995 IAAF World Cross Country Championships – Senior men's race
- 1995 IAAF World Cross Country Championships – Junior men's race
- 1995 IAAF World Cross Country Championships – Senior women's race
