= 1996 IAAF World Cross Country Championships =

- Organisers: IAAF
- Edition: 24th
- Date: March 23
- Host city: Stellenbosch, Western Cape, South Africa
- Venue: Danie Craven Stadium
- Events: 4
- Distances: 12.15 km – Senior men 8.35 km – Junior men 6.3 km – Senior women 4.22 km – Junior women
- Participation: 669 athletes from 65 nations

The 1996 IAAF World Cross Country Championships was held in Stellenbosch, South Africa, at the Danie Craven Stadium on March 23, 1996. A preview on the event was given in the Herald, and a report in The New York Times.

Complete results for senior men, junior men, senior women, junior women, medallists, and the results of British athletes were published.

== Medallists ==
Event	Gold		Silver		Bronze	
Individual
Senior men (12.15 km)	Paul Tergat; Kenya	33:44	Salah Hissou; Morocco	33:56	Ismael Kirui; Kenya	33:57
Junior men (8.35 km)	David Chelule; Kenya	24:06	Assefa Mezegebu; Ethiopia	24:19	Samuel Chepkok; Kenya	24:24
Senior women (6.3 km)	Gete Wami; Ethiopia	20:12	Rose Cheruiyot; Kenya	20:18	Naomi Mugo; Kenya	20:21
Junior women (4.22 km)	Kutre Dulecha; Ethiopia	13:27	Annemari Sandell; Finland	13:32	Jepkorir Ayabei; Kenya	13:35
Team
Senior men	Kenya	33	Morocco	99	Ethiopia	107
Junior men	Kenya	13	Ethiopia	26	Morocco	94
Senior women	Kenya	24	Ethiopia	44	Romania	70
Junior women	Kenya	21	Ethiopia	26	Japan	70

== Race results ==
=== Senior men's race (12.15 km) ===
Individual race
Rank	Athlete	Country	Time
1st place, gold medalist(s)	Paul Tergat	Kenya	33:44
2nd place, silver medalist(s)	Salah Hissou	Morocco	33:56
3rd place, bronze medalist(s)	Ismael Kirui	Kenya	33:57
4	Paul Koech	Kenya	34:10
5	Haile Gebrselassie	Ethiopia	34:28
6	Joseph Kimani	Kenya	34:30
7	Khalid Skah	Morocco	34:34
8	Smail Sghir	Morocco	34:34
9	William Kiptum	Kenya	34:35
10	Josephat Machuka	Kenya	34:37
11	Abraham Assefa	Ethiopia	34:55
12	Jon Brown	United Kingdom	34:55
Full results

Teams
Rank	Team	Points
1st place, gold medalist(s)	Kenya: Paul Tergat / 1; Ismael Kirui / 3; Paul Koech / 4; Joseph Kimani / 6; William Kiptum / 9; Josephat Machuka / 10; (Stephen Arusei) / (14); (James Songok) / (23); (James Kariuki) / (61)	33
2nd place, silver medalist(s)	Morocco: Salah Hissou / 2; Khalid Skah / 7; Smail Sghir / 8; Abderrahim Zitouna / 13; Mustapha Bamouh / 29; Khaled Boulami / 40; (Mohamed Issangar) / (52); (Abdelaziz Sahere) / (54); (Brahim Boulami) / (78)	99
3rd place, bronze medalist(s)	Ethiopia: Haile Gebrselassie / 5; Abraham Assefa / 11; Habte Jifar / 17; Fita Bayissa / 18; Ayele Mezegebu / 21; Chala Kelele / 35; (Girma Tolla) / (39); (Nigousse Urge) / (71); (Tesfaye Tafa) / (DNF)	107
4	Spain	205
5	United Kingdom	252
6	Italy	352
7	South Africa	379
8	Portugal	397
Full results

- Note: Athletes in parentheses did not score for the team result

=== Junior men's race (8.35 km) ===
Individual race
Rank	Athlete	Country	Time
1st place, gold medalist(s)	David Chelule	Kenya	24:06
2nd place, silver medalist(s)	Assefa Mezegebu	Ethiopia	24:19
3rd place, bronze medalist(s)	Samuel Chepkok	Kenya	24:24
4	Elijah Korir	Kenya	24:26
5	Charles Kwambai	Kenya	24:28
6	Mizan Mehari	Ethiopia	24:51
7	Kipchumba Mitei	Kenya	24:55
8	Million Wolde	Ethiopia	24:56
9	Patrick Ivuti	Kenya	25:00
10	Lemma Alemayehu	Ethiopia	25:34
11	Miloud Abaoub	Algeria	25:42
12	David Galindo	Mexico	25:43
Full results

Teams
Rank	Team	Points
1st place, gold medalist(s)	Kenya: David Chelule / 1; Samuel Chepkok / 3; Elijah Korir / 4; Charles Kwambai / 5; (Kipchumba Mitei) / (7); (Patrick Ivuti) / (9)	13
2nd place, silver medalist(s)	Ethiopia: Assefa Mezegebu / 2; Mizan Mehari / 6; Million Wolde / 8; Lemma Alemayehu / 10; (Sisay Bezabeh) / (13); (Geremew Haile) / (28)	26
3rd place, bronze medalist(s)	Morocco: Aziz Driouche / 14; Abderrahman Chmaiti / 19; Rachid Amroug / 20; Rachid Boulahdid / 41; (Ahmed Ezzobayry) / (47); (Abdelghani Lahlali) / (DNF)	94
4	Algeria	100
5	South Africa	140
6	China	158
7	Japan	158
8	Spain	197
Full results

- Note: Athletes in parentheses did not score for the team result

=== Senior women's race (6.3 km) ===
Individual race
Rank	Athlete	Country	Time
1st place, gold medalist(s)	Gete Wami	Ethiopia	20:12
2nd place, silver medalist(s)	Rose Cheruiyot	Kenya	20:18
3rd place, bronze medalist(s)	Naomi Mugo	Kenya	20:21
4	Derartu Tulu	Ethiopia	20:21
5	Colleen de Reuck	South Africa	20:21
6	Fernanda Ribeiro	Portugal	20:23
7	Julia Vaquero	Spain	20:28
8	Jane Ngotho	Kenya	20:31
9	Gabriela Szabo	Romania	20:37
10	Berhane Adere	Ethiopia	20:37
11	Sally Barsosio	Kenya	20:43
12	Iulia Negura	Romania	20:55
Full results

Teams
Rank	Team	Points
1st place, gold medalist(s)	Kenya: Rose Cheruiyot / 2; Naomi Mugo / 3; Jane Ngotho / 8; Sally Barsosio / 11; (Florence Barsosio) / (15); (Lornah Kiplagat) / (80)	24
2nd place, silver medalist(s)	Ethiopia: Gete Wami / 1; Derartu Tulu / 4; Berhane Adere / 10; Getenesh Urge / 29; (Asha Gigi) / (43); (Kore Alemu) / (57)	44
3rd place, bronze medalist(s)	Romania: Gabriela Szabo / 9; Iulia Negura / 12; Elena Fidatof / 17; Mariana Chirila / 32; (Viorica Ghican) / (38); (Lelia Deselnicu) / (41)	70
4	Australia	92
5	Portugal	104
6	France	111
7	Spain	116
8	Japan	124
Full results

- Note: Athletes in parentheses did not score for the team result

=== Junior women's race (4.22 km) ===
Individual race
Rank	Athlete	Country	Time
1st place, gold medalist(s)	Kutre Dulecha	Ethiopia	13:27
2nd place, silver medalist(s)	Annemari Sandell	Finland	13:32
3rd place, bronze medalist(s)	Jepkorir Ayabei	Kenya	13:35
4	Nancy Kipron	Kenya	13:49
5	Edna Kiplagat	Kenya	13:50
6	Etaferahu Tarekegn	Ethiopia	13:53
7	Cristina Iloc	Romania	13:56
8	Shura Hotesa	Ethiopia	13:59
9	Elizabeth Cheptanui	Kenya	14:00
10	Caroline Tarus	Kenya	14:04
11	Ayelech Worku	Ethiopia	14:09
12	Sintayahu Fikre	Ethiopia	14:12
Full results

Teams
Rank	Team	Points
1st place, gold medalist(s)	Kenya: Jepkorir Ayabei / 3; Nancy Kipron / 4; Edna Kiplagat / 5; Elizabeth Cheptanui / 9; (Caroline Tarus) / (10)	21
2nd place, silver medalist(s)	Ethiopia: Kutre Dulecha / 1; Etaferahu Tarekegn / 6; Shura Hotesa / 8; Ayelech Worku / 11; (Sintayahu Fikre) / (12); (Zenebech Tadese) / (14)	26
3rd place, bronze medalist(s)	Japan: Emiko Kojima / 15; Yuka Hata / 16; Tomoko Hashimoto / 17; Kaori Yoshimura / 22; (Emi Kato) / (63); (Ayumi Iwashita) / (64)	70
4	Romania	78
5	United States	123
6	Spain	146
7	South Africa	174
8	France	214
Full results

- Note: Athletes in parentheses did not score for the team result

== Medal table (unofficial) ==
Rank	Nation	Gold	Silver	Bronze	Total
1	Kenya	6	1	4	11
2	Ethiopia	2	4	1	7
3	Morocco	0	2	1	3
4	Finland	0	1	0	1
5	Japan	0	0	1	1
5	Romania	0	0	1	1
Totals (6 entries)		8	8	8	24

- Note: Totals include both individual and team medals, with medals in the team competition counting as one medal.

== Participation ==
An unofficial count yields the participation of 669 athletes from 65 countries. This is in agreement with the official numbers as published.

- Algeria (6)
- Angola (3)
- Argentina (8)
- Australia (15)
- Belarus (7)
- Belgium (16)
- Botswana (10)
- Brazil (20)
- Cameroon (4)
- Canada (18)
- China (7)
- Chinese Taipei (2)
- Colombia (10)
- Congo (1)
- Croatia (3)
- Czech Republic (4)
- Egypt (2)
- Estonia (1)
- Ethiopia (27)
- Fiji (6)
- Finland (16)
- France (27)
- Germany (2)
- Hong Kong (1)
- Hungary (2)
- India (18)
- Ireland (14)
- Israel (1)
- Italy (27)
- Jamaica (10)
- Japan (22)
- Kazakhstan (2)
- Kenya (26)
- Lesotho (9)
- Lithuania (1)
- Malawi (7)
- Mauritius (12)
- Mexico (12)
- Morocco (17)
- Mozambique (5)
- Namibia (11)
- Netherlands (16)
- New Zealand (12)
- Papua New Guinea (8)
- Poland (1)
- Portugal (17)
- Romania (13)
- Russia (10)
- Senegal (1)
- Seychelles (4)
- Slovakia (2)
- South Africa (27)
- Spain (27)
- Eswatini (6)
- Sweden (1)
- Switzerland (8)
- Tajikistan (2)
- Tanzania (10)
- Uganda (7)
- Ukraine (6)
- United Kingdom (26)
- United States (26)
- Yugoslavia (5)
- Zambia (3)
- Zimbabwe (19)

== See also ==
- 1996 IAAF World Cross Country Championships – Senior men's race
- 1996 IAAF World Cross Country Championships – Junior men's race
- 1996 IAAF World Cross Country Championships – Senior women's race
- 1996 IAAF World Cross Country Championships – Junior women's race
- 1996 in athletics (track and field)
