= 1996 IAAF World Cross Country Championships – Junior men's race =

Junior men's race at the 1996 IAAF World Cross Country Championships
- Organisers: IAAF
- Edition: 24th
- Date: March 23
- Host city: Stellenbosch, Western Cape, South Africa
- Venue: Danie Craven Stadium
- Events: 1
- Distances: 8.35 km – Junior men
- Participation: 140 athletes from 38 nations

The Junior men's race at the 1996 IAAF World Cross Country Championships was held in Stellenbosch, South Africa, at the Danie Craven Stadium on March 23, 1996. A preview on the event was given in the Herald, and a report in The New York Times.

Complete results, medallists, and the results of British athletes were published.

== Race results ==
=== Junior men's race (8.35 km) ===
==== Individual ====
Rank	Athlete	Country	Time
1st place, gold medalist(s)	David Chelule	Kenya	24:06
2nd place, silver medalist(s)	Assefa Mezegebu	Ethiopia	24:19
3rd place, bronze medalist(s)	Samuel Chepkok	Kenya	24:24
4	Elijah Korir	Kenya	24:26
5	Charles Kwambai	Kenya	24:28
6	Mizan Mehari	Ethiopia	24:51
7	Kipchumba Mitei	Kenya	24:55
8	Million Wolde	Ethiopia	24:56
9	Patrick Ivuti	Kenya	25:00
10	Lemma Alemayehu	Ethiopia	25:34
11	Miloud Abaoub	Algeria	25:42
12	David Galindo	Mexico	25:43
13	Sisay Bezabeh	Ethiopia	25:43
14	Aziz Driouche	Morocco	25:43
15	Naoki Mishiro	Japan	26:06
16	Adrian Maghiar	Romania	26:06
17	Gert-Jan Liefers	Netherlands	26:09
18	Azzedine Zerdoum	Algeria	26:10
19	Abderrahman Chmaiti	Morocco	26:11
20	Rachid Amroug	Morocco	26:18
21	Grigoriy Generalov	Russia	26:20
22	Marilson dos Santos	Brazil	26:21
23	Dalibor Balgac	Croatia	26:23
24	Mokhejano Lesenyeho	Lesotho	26:23
25	Sun Wenyong	China	26:27
26	Richard Mavuso	South Africa	26:27
27	Brad Hauser	United States	26:29
28	Geremew Haile	Ethiopia	26:30
29	Lazarus Ramasia	South Africa	26:31
30	Nobuhiko Okada	Japan	26:31
31	Aaron Gabonewe	South Africa	26:35
32	Abdelmadjid Bouchamia	Algeria	26:36
33	Julián Peralta	Argentina	26:37
34	Wang Zhicheng	China	26:38
35	Janko Bensa	FR Yugoslavia	26:39
36	Francisco Mondragon	Mexico	26:41
37	Allen Graffin	United Kingdom	26:41
38	Wang Hongliang	China	26:47
39	Latamene Oumouhand	Algeria	26:47
40	Chaka Zihanzu	Zimbabwe	26:53
41	Rachid Boulahdid	Morocco	26:53
42	Francis Chibika	Zimbabwe	26:54
43	Rui Silva	Portugal	26:56
44	David Posada	Spain	26:57
45	Francisco Navarro	Spain	26:57
46	Paulo Lunkes	Brazil	26:57
47	Ahmed Ezzobayry	Morocco	26:59
48	Kais Bouziane	Algeria	27:00
49	Kensuke Takahashi	Japan	27:01
50	Brent Hauser	United States	27:02
51	Juan Carlos Higuero	Spain	27:03
52	Bertus Bock	Namibia	27:05
53	Baghdad Rachem	Algeria	27:07
54	Richard Mncwabe	South Africa	27:07
55	Dmitriy Maksimov	Russia	27:07
56	Andries Moss	South Africa	27:10
57	Juan José Lozano	Spain	27:11
58	Luca Rosa	Italy	27:12
59	Antonio Jiménez	Spain	27:12
60	Edgar Quiroz	Mexico	27:13
61	Sun Wenli	China	27:15
62	Adil Rabihi	France	27:20
63	Hudson de Souza	Brazil	27:20
64	Naoto Suzuki	Japan	27:21
65	Kevin Nash	United Kingdom	27:22
66	Gaël Pencréach	France	27:31
67	Kazumasa Yamato	Japan	27:33
68	John Schoenfelder	United States	27:36
69	Satish Kumar	India	27:38
70	Simon Wilkinson	United Kingdom	27:40
71	Jeroen Broekzitter	Netherlands	27:42
72	Andrea Busetto	Italy	27:43
73	Sanjeev Nair	India	27:46
74	Murray Link	Canada	27:47
75	Ephraim Mokhotu	South Africa	27:48
75	Martin Dent	Australia	27:48
77	Aleksey Shestakov	Kazakhstan	27:52
78	Jussi Utriainen	Finland	27:54
79	Mark Thompson	Australia	27:54
80	Antonio Arce	United States	27:54
81	Moses Chipani	Zimbabwe	27:55
82	Tawanda Magarasadza	Zimbabwe	27:56
83	Jon Grimsley	United States	27:57
84	Scott McClennan	Canada	27:59
85	Franck Lanois	France	28:01
86	Marshall Armitage	Canada	28:02
87	Michael Maechler	Switzerland	28:02
88	Steve Lawrence	Canada	28:03
89	Sam Haughian	United Kingdom	28:04
90	Norbert Rutjindo	Namibia	28:07
91	Francisco Jesus	Spain	28:09
92	David Dala	Angola	28:12
93	Igor Zhavaranak	Belarus	28:12
94	Eligio Romero	Mexico	28:13
95	Rahul Shoukeen	India	28:13
96	Alberto Mosca	Italy	28:14
97	Yasuhida Maeda	Japan	28:17
98	Mikael Talasjoki	Finland	28:22
99	Cristobal Valenzuela	Argentina	28:23
100	Tiala Ramichi	Lesotho	28:23
101	Ndara Petrus	Namibia	28:24
102	Mathew Coley	Canada	28:28
103	Balasheb Nikam	India	28:29
104	Kjell van Melkebeke	Belgium	28:41
105	Viktor Kulakovitsh	Belarus	28:41
106	Jyrki Niemelä	Finland	28:43
107	Artyon Zhigalov	Kazakhstan	28:44
108	Steve Bohan	Canada	28:44
109	Jorge Mitano Alberto	Mozambique	28:48
110	Alex Oldfield	United Kingdom	28:52
111	Kevin Musseliah	Mauritius	28:53
112	Roel Robberecht	Belgium	28:53
113	Lorenzo Marrocu	Italy	29:00
114	Pierre-André Ramuz	Switzerland	29:21
115	Damien Rouquet	France	29:38
116	Michael Endjala	Namibia	29:44
117	Nako Motseko	Lesotho	30:00
118	Ariel Frías	Argentina	30:02
119	Jonathan Joson	Mauritius	30:04
120	Steven Heemskerk	Belgium	30:15
121	Bernard Joseph	Mauritius	30:23
122	Rajaye Potanau	Mauritius	30:23
123	Selwyn Bonne	Seychelles	31:00
124	David Kanie	Papua New Guinea	31:44
125	Gerry Mathiot	Seychelles	32:00
126	Makhetha Phats’oane	Lesotho	32:08
127	Daniel Henry	Seychelles	32:54
128	Ruben Vera	Argentina	32:54
—	Roy Delorie	Seychelles	DNF
—	William Velirick	Belgium	DNF
—	Romulo da Silva	Brazil	DNF
—	Fouad Chouki	France	DNF
—	Vincent Rollier	France	DNF
—	Thomas Mayo	United Kingdom	DNF
—	Keith Kelly	Ireland	DNF
—	Claudio Brandalise	Italy	DNF
—	Fabio Cesari	Italy	DNF
—	Abdelghani Lahlali	Morocco	DNF
—	Russell Coleman	United States	DNF
—	Gustavo Ely	Brazil	DNF

==== Teams ====
Rank	Team	Points
1st place, gold medalist(s)	Kenya: David Chelule / 1; Samuel Chepkok / 3; Elijah Korir / 4; Charles Kwambai / 5; (Kipchumba Mitei) / (7); (Patrick Ivuti) / (9)	13
2nd place, silver medalist(s)	Ethiopia: Assefa Mezegebu / 2; Mizan Mehari / 6; Million Wolde / 8; Lemma Alemayehu / 10; (Sisay Bezabeh) / (13); (Geremew Haile) / (28)	26
3rd place, bronze medalist(s)	Morocco: Aziz Driouche / 14; Abderrahman Chmaiti / 19; Rachid Amroug / 20; Rachid Boulahdid / 41; (Ahmed Ezzobayry) / (47); (Abdelghani Lahlali) / (DNF)	94
4	Algeria: Miloud Abaoub / 11; Azzedine Zerdoum / 18; Abdelmadjid Bouchamia / 32; Latamene Oumouhand / 39; (Kais Bouziane) / (48); (Baghdad Rachem) / (53)	100
5	South Africa: Richard Mavuso / 26; Lazarus Ramasia / 29; Aaron Gabonewe / 31; Richard Mncwabe / 54; (Andries Moss) / (56); (Ephraim Mokhotu) / (75)	140
6	China: Sun Wenyong / 25; Wang Zhicheng / 34; Wang Hongliang / 38; Sun Wenli / 61	158
7	Japan: Naoki Mishiro / 15; Nobuhiko Okada / 30; Kensuke Takahashi / 49; Naoto Suzuki / 64; (Kazumasa Yamato) / (67); (Yasuhida Maeda) / (97)	158
8	Spain: David Posada / 44; Francisco Navarro / 45; Juan Carlos Higuero / 51; Juan José Lozano / 57; (Antonio Jiménez) / (59); (Francisco Jesus) / (91)	197
9	Mexico: David Galindo / 12; Francisco Mondragon / 36; Edgar Quiroz / 60; Eligio Romero / 94	202
10	United States: Brad Hauser / 27; Brent Hauser / 50; John Schoenfelder / 68; Antonio Arce / 80; (Jon Grimsley) / (83); (Russell Coleman) / (DNF)	225
11	Zimbabwe: Chaka Zihanzu / 40; Francis Chibika / 42; Moses Chipani / 81; Tawanda Magarasadza / 82	245
12	United Kingdom: Allen Graffin / 37; Kevin Nash / 65; Simon Wilkinson / 70; Sam Haughian / 89; (Alex Oldfield) / (110); (Thomas Mayo) / (DNF)	261
13	France: Adil Rabihi / 62; Gaël Pencréach / 66; Franck Lanois / 85; Damien Rouquet / 115; (Fouad Chouki) / (DNF); (Vincent Rollier) / (DNF)	328
14	Canada: Murray Link / 74; Scott McClennan / 84; Marshall Armitage / 86; Steve Lawrence / 88; (Mathew Coley) / (102); (Steve Bohan) / (108)	332
15	Italy: Luca Rosa / 58; Andrea Busetto / 72; Alberto Mosca / 96; Lorenzo Marrocu / 113; (Claudio Brandalise) / (DNF); (Fabio Cesari) / (DNF)	339
16	India: Satish Kumar / 69; Sanjeev Nair / 73; Rahul Shoukeen / 95; Balasheb Nikam / 103	340
17	Namibia: Bertus Bock / 52; Norbert Rutjindo / 90; Ndara Petrus / 101; Michael Endjala / 116	359
18	Lesotho: Mokhejano Lesenyeho / 24; Tiala Ramichi / 100; Nako Motseko / 117; Makhetha Phats’oane / 126	367
19	Argentina: Julián Peralta / 33; Cristobal Valenzuela / 99; Ariel Frías / 118; Ruben Vera / 128	378
20	Mauritius: Kevin Musseliah / 111; Jonathan Joson / 119; Bernard Joseph / 121; Rajaye Potanau / 122	473
DNF	Brazil: (Marilson dos Santos) / (22); (Paulo Lunkes) / (46); (Hudson de Souza) / (63); (Romulo da Silva) / (DNF); (Gustavo Ely) / (DNF)	DNF
DNF	Belgium: (Kjell van Melkebeke) / (104); (Roel Robberecht) / (112); (Steven Heemskerk) / (120); (William Velirick) / (DNF)	DNF
DNF	Seychelles: (Selwyn Bonne) / (123); (Gerry Mathiot) / (125); (Daniel Henry) / (127); (Roy Delorie) / (DNF)	DNF

- Note: Athletes in parentheses did not score for the team result

== Participation ==
An unofficial count yields the participation of 140 athletes from 38 countries in the Junior men's race. This is in agreement with the official numbers as published.

- Algeria (6)
- Angola (1)
- Argentina (4)
- Australia (2)
- Belarus (2)
- Belgium (4)
- Brazil (5)
- Canada (6)
- China (4)
- Croatia (1)
- Ethiopia (6)
- Finland (3)
- France (6)
- India (4)
- Ireland (1)
- Italy (6)
- Japan (6)
- Kazakhstan (2)
- Kenya (6)
- Lesotho (4)
- Mauritius (4)
- Mexico (4)
- Morocco (6)
- Mozambique (1)
- Namibia (4)
- Netherlands (2)
- Papua New Guinea (1)
- Portugal (1)
- Romania (1)
- Russia (2)
- Seychelles (4)
- South Africa (6)
- Spain (6)
- Switzerland (2)
- United Kingdom (6)
- United States (6)
- FR Yugoslavia (1)
- Zimbabwe (4)

== See also ==
- 1996 IAAF World Cross Country Championships – Senior men's race
- 1996 IAAF World Cross Country Championships – Senior women's race
- 1996 IAAF World Cross Country Championships – Junior women's race
