= 1997 European Athletics U23 Championships – Women's 10,000 metres =

The women's 10,000 metres event at the 1997 European Athletics U23 Championships was held in Turku, Finland, on 13 July 1997.

== Medalists ==
Gold	Olivera Jevtić; Yugoslavia
Silver	Annemari Sandell; Finland
Bronze	Stine Larsen; Norway

== Results ==
=== Final ===
13 July

Rank	Name	Nationality	Time	Notes
1st place, gold medalist(s)	Olivera Jevtić	Yugoslavia	32:44.22	
2nd place, silver medalist(s)	Annemari Sandell	Finland	32:48.57	
3rd place, bronze medalist(s)	Stine Larsen	Norway	33:11.09	
4	Anikó Kálovics	Hungary	33:27.41	
5	Svetlana Baygulova	Russia	33:29.05	
6	Jeļena Čelnova	Latvia	33:41.51	
7	Galina Bogomolova	Russia	33:48.43	
8	Sonja Deckers	Belgium	33:54.22	
9	Inna Masjunas	Latvia	34:43.30	
10	Chryssie Girard	France	35:16.78	
11	Sandra Hervas	Spain	37:12.26	
	Maria Stella Di Santo	Italy	DNF	

== Participation ==
According to an unofficial count, 12 athletes from 10 countries participated in the event.

- Belgium (1)
- Finland (1)
- France (1)
- Hungary (1)
- Italy (1)
- Latvia (2)
- Norway (1)
- Russia (2)
- Spain (1)
- Yugoslavia (1)
