= 1997 European Athletics U23 Championships – Women's 5000 metres =

The women's 5000 metres event at the 1997 European Athletics U23 Championships was held in Turku, Finland, on 10 July 1997.

== Medalists ==
Gold	Oksana Zheleznyak; Russia
Silver	Cristina Iloc; Romania
Bronze	Marta Domínguez; Spain

== Results ==
=== Final ===
10 July

Rank	Name	Nationality	Time	Notes
1st place, gold medalist(s)	Oksana Zheleznyak	Russia	15:45.22	
2nd place, silver medalist(s)	Cristina Iloc	Romania	15:46.59	
3rd place, bronze medalist(s)	Marta Domínguez	Spain	15:49.96	
4	Annemari Sandell	Finland	15:50.94	
5	Jeļena Čelnova	Latvia	15:55.74	
6	Stine Larsen	Norway	15:56.92	
7	Galina Bogomolova	Russia	15:58.60	
8	Jenny Framme	Sweden	16:10.95	
9	Inna Masjunas	Latvia	16:12.87	
10	Denisa Costescu	Romania	16:14.86	
11	Maria Stella Di Santo	Italy	16:39.41	
	Olivera Jevtić	Yugoslavia	DNF	

== Participation ==
According to an unofficial count, 12 athletes from 9 countries participated in the event.

- Finland (1)
- Italy (1)
- Latvia (2)
- Norway (1)
- Romania (2)
- Russia (2)
- Spain (1)
- Sweden (1)
- Yugoslavia (1)
