= James Songok =

Kenyan long-distance runner

Medal record

Men's athletics

African Championships
Gold medal – first place	1992 Belle Vue Maurel	5000 m

World Cross Country Championships
Gold medal – first place	1994 Budapest	Senior team
Gold medal – first place	1995 Durham	Senior team

James Songok (born 23 July 1970) is a Kenyan male long-distance runner who competed in cross country, track and road running.

He began his career focusing on track running and after a bronze medal in the 10,000 metres at the 1988 World Junior Championships in Athletics, he went on to win the 5000 metres title at the Kenyan Athletics Championships, then the gold medal in that event at the 1992 African Championships in Athletics.

Songok represented Kenya at the IAAF World Cross Country Championships on three occasions. He helped the Kenyan men to the team title in both 1994 and 1995, taking sixth then seventh place, respectively. He was picked for a third time running, but managed on 23rd place in the 1996 race. He attempted to convert to road races thereafter but, after moderate success of fourth at the Stramilano and second at the Puy-en-Velay 15K, he ceased competing after the 1997 season.

== Personal bests ==
- 3000 metres – 7:52.20 (1994)
- 5000 metres – 13:24.63 (1992)
- 10,000 metres – 28:50.42 (1988)
- Half marathon – 1:03:53 (2000)

== International competitions ==
Year	Competition	Venue	Position	Event	Notes
1988	World Junior Championships	Sudbury, Canada	3rd	10,000 m	28:50.42
1992	African Championships	Belle Vue Maurel, Mauritius	1st	5000 m	13:24.63
1994	World Cross Country Championships	Budapest, Hungary	6th	Senior race	35:02
1994	World Cross Country Championships	Budapest, Hungary	1st	Senior team	34 pts
1995	World Cross Country Championships	Durham, United Kingdom	7th	Senior race	34:41
1995	World Cross Country Championships	Durham, United Kingdom	1st	Senior team	62 pts
1996	World Cross Country Championships	Stellenbosch, South Africa	23rd	Senior race	35:29

== National titles ==
- Kenyan Athletics Championships
  - 5000 m: 1990

== See also ==
- List of champions of the African Championships in Athletics
