= 1996 World Junior Championships in Athletics – Women's 3000 metres =

The women's 3000 metres event at the 1996 World Junior Championships in Athletics was held in Sydney, Australia, at International Athletic Centre on 21 and 22 August.

== Medalists ==
Gold	Anita Weyermann; Switzerland
Silver	Edna Kiplagat; Kenya
Bronze	Etaferahu Tarekegn; Ethiopia

== Results ==
=== Final ===
22 August

Rank	Name	Nationality	Time	Notes
1st place, gold medalist(s)	Anita Weyermann	Switzerland	8:50.73	
2nd place, silver medalist(s)	Edna Kiplagat	Kenya	8:53.06	
3rd place, bronze medalist(s)	Etaferahu Tarekegn	Ethiopia	8:53.77	
4	Ayelech Worku	Ethiopia	8:54.24	
5	Olivera Jevtić	Yugoslavia	9:06.95	
6	Sun Guanghong	China	9:07.14	
7	Miwako Yamanaka	Japan	9:09.06	
8	Elizabeth Chemweno	Kenya	9:12.22	
9	Maria Ungureanu	Romania	9:12.71	
10	Sunita Rani	India	9:13.57	
11	Julia Stamps	United States	9:19.63	
12	Yuko Manabe	Japan	9:46.69	

=== Heats ===
21 August

==== Heat 1 ====
Rank	Name	Nationality	Time	Notes
1	Etaferahu Tarekegn	Ethiopia	9:17.10	Q
2	Edna Kiplagat	Kenya	9:17.51	Q
3	Olivera Jevtić	Yugoslavia	9:17.98	Q
4	Sun Guanghong	China	9:18.17	Q
5	Miwako Yamanaka	Japan	9:19.04	q
6	Evelyne Coussement	Belgium	9:29.99	
7	Leonor Carneiro	Portugal	9:32.18	
8	Katalin Szentgyörgyi	Hungary	9:36.22	
9	Galina Bogomolova	Russia	9:42.99	
10	Sylvia Nussbeck	Germany	10:02.97	

==== Heat 2 ====
Rank	Name	Nationality	Time	Notes
1	Elizabeth Chemweno	Kenya	9:16.55	Q
2	Maria Ungureanu	Romania	9:17.03	Q
3	Ayelech Worku	Ethiopia	9:17.42	Q
4	Anita Weyermann	Switzerland	9:18.15	Q
5	Sunita Rani	India	9:18.72	q
6	Julia Stamps	United States	9:22.76	q
7	Yuko Manabe	Japan	9:28.54	q
8	Anikó Kálovics	Hungary	9:28.88	
9	Ulrike Maisch	Germany	9:30.82	

== Participation ==
According to an unofficial count, 19 athletes from 14 countries participated in the event.

- Belgium (1)
- China (1)
- Ethiopia (2)
- Germany (2)
- Hungary (2)
- India (1)
- Japan (2)
- Kenya (2)
- Portugal (1)
- Romania (1)
- Russia (1)
- Switzerland (1)
- United States (1)
- Yugoslavia (1)
