= Stramilano =

Running competition based in Milan

The Stramilano is an annual athletics event which takes place in Milan, Italy in spring. The event comprises three parts: the Stramilano International Half Marathon (a professional road running competition over 21.0975 km), the La Stramilano dei 50.000 (English: Stramilano of the 50,000; a 10 km non-competitive run/walk open to the general public) and the Stramilanina – a 5 km event for younger people.

The event was conceived in 1972 by the Italian Renato Cepparo. The idea took shape after the unexpected success of the Milan-Proserpio walk, a 43-km, "non-competitive" walk which Cepparo organized at the beginning with a handful of friends and then in an "open" format for anyone who wanted to take part starting from 18 September 1971.

The first Stramilano took place on 14 March 1972, as a nocturnal walk which ran along the entire outer ring road (about 22 km) and saw over 4,000 participants. Subsequently organisation was taken up by the sports group Fior di Roccia, and participation rose steadily until it settled at an average of 50,000 participants: for this reason the non-competitive race is called "Stramilano of the 50,000".

Over time, the event changed: the route was shortened (in 2008 it was cut down to 12 km and in 2009 it was further reduced to 10 km) and the non-competitive race was complemented, from 1976 by the "Stramilano Agonistica", reserved to professional athletes, run on the same distance as the "half marathon" (21 km and 97 m). Moreover, besides the main event the "Stramilanina" is also organised for children, with a route of only 6 km (reduced to 5 km in 2009). In the last few years this event has been taken up as a model and similar events take place in foreign cities, for example the Stralugano in Lugano, Switzerland.

The 2020 edition of the event was postponed due to the coronavirus pandemic.

== Half marathon winners ==
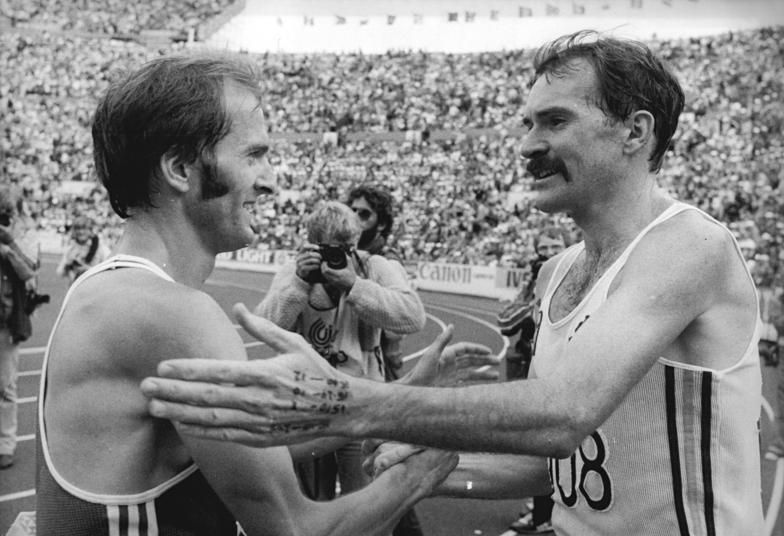
The 1981 winner Robert de Castella (right) won the inaugural World Championships marathon two years later.

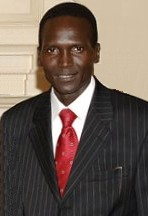
Kenyan Paul Tergat won an unrivalled six times consecutively from 1994–1999.

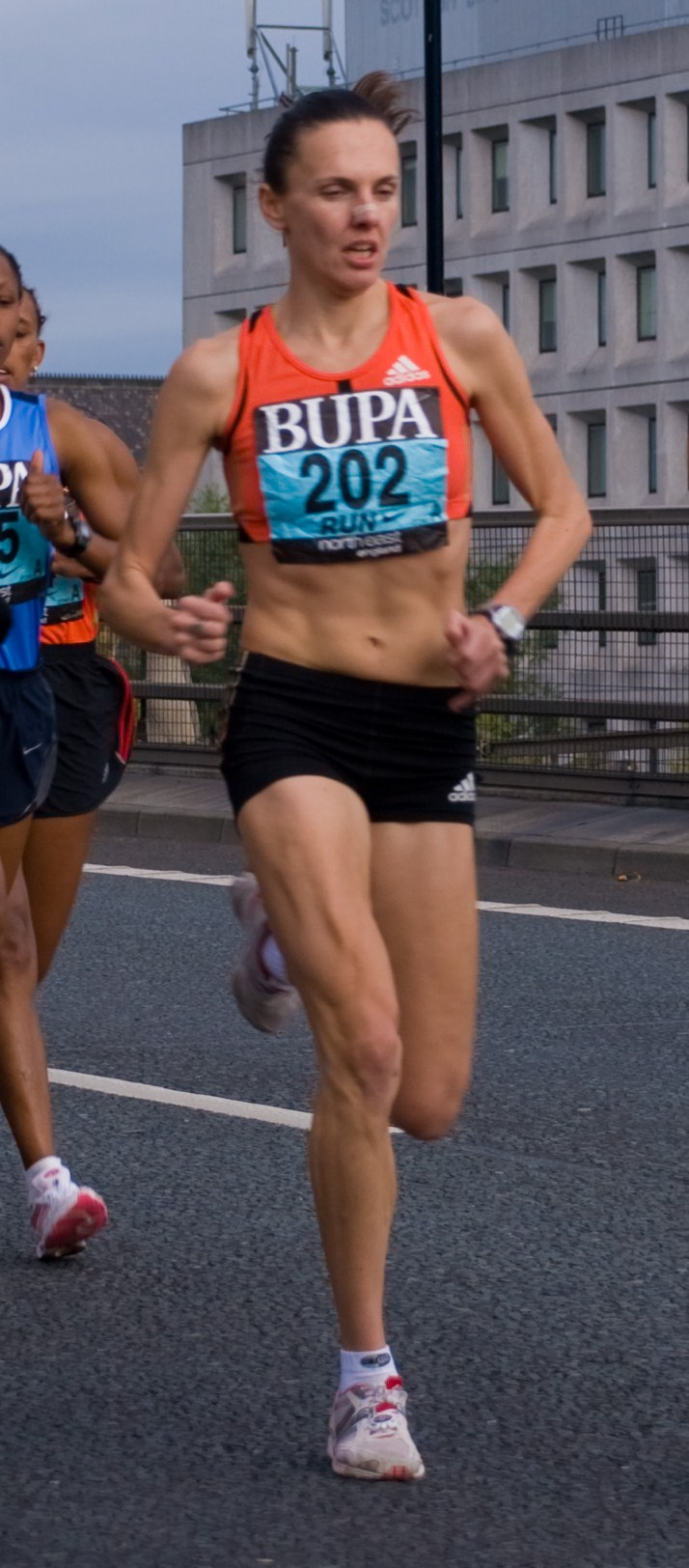
Anikó Kálovics of Hungary won three times in a row.

Key: Course record Italian championship race

Edition	Year	Men's winner	Time (h:m:s)	Women's winner	Time (h:m:s)
1st	1972	?		Not held	
2nd	1973	?		Not held	
3rd	1974	?		Not held	
4th	1975	Sig. Pigatello		Not held	
5th	1976	Víctor Mora (COL)	1:01:42	Silvana Cruciata (ITA)	1:15:27
6th	1977	Mohamed Kedir (ETH)	1:03:26	Silvana Cruciata (ITA)	1:22:05
7th	1978	Franco Fava (ITA)	1:04:31	Silvana Cruciata (ITA)	1:18:44
8th	1979	Edmundo Warnke (CHI)	1:07:05	Barbara Moore (NZL)	1:18:30
9th	1980	Robele Wolde (ETH)	1:06:04	Not held	
10th	1981	Robert de Castella (AUS)	1:04:52	Silvana Cruciata (ITA)	1:17:39
11th	1982	Mohamed Kedir (ETH)	1:01:02	Grete Waitz (NOR)	1:09:19
12th	1983	Alberto Cova (ITA)	1:03:28	Rosa Mota (POR)	1:13:22
13th	1984	Alberto Cova (ITA)	1:01:52	Laura Fogli (ITA)	1:14:10
14th	1985	Enzo Davoglio (ITA)	1:07:14	Carla Beurskens (NED)	1:12:30
15th	1986	Alberto Cova (ITA)	1:02:04	Not held	
16th	1987	Gelindo Bordin (ITA)	1:03:16	Not held	
17th	1988	Diamantino dos Santos (BRA)	1:02:51	Not held	
18th	1989 †	John Ngugi (KEN)	1:01:24	Not held	
19th	1990	Moses Tanui (KEN)	1:01:43	Not held	
20th	1991	Moses Tanui (KEN)	1:00:51	Not held	
21st	1992	Moses Tanui (KEN)	1:01:06	Not held	
22nd	1993	Moses Tanui (KEN)	59:47	Rosanna Munerotto (ITA)	1:11:07
23rd	1994	Paul Tergat (KEN)	1:00:13	Maria Guida (ITA)	1:10:19
24th	1995	Paul Tergat (KEN)	59:56	Not held	
25th	1996	Paul Tergat (KEN)	58:51	Not held	
26th	1997	Paul Tergat (KEN)	1:00:23	Not held	
27th	1998	Paul Tergat (KEN)	59:17	Not held	
28th	1999	Paul Tergat (KEN)	59:22	Not held	
29th	2000	Patrick Ivuti (KEN)	1:00:49	Not held	
30th	2001	Patrick Ivuti (KEN)	1:00:42	Not held	
31st	2002	Rachid Berradi (ITA)	1:00:20	Not held	
32nd	2003	John Yuda (TAN)	1:00:25	Not held	
33rd	2004	Robert Kipchumba (KEN)	1:00:21	Tiziana Alagia (ITA)	1:13:21
34th	2005	Wilson Kebenei (KEN)	1:00:11	Anikó Kálovics (HUN)	1:11:57
35th	2006	Paul Kimaiyo (KEN)	1:00:49	Anikó Kálovics (HUN)	1:10:55
36th	2007	Philemon Kipchumba Kisang (KEN)	1:00:55	Anikó Kálovics (HUN)	1:08:58
37th	2008	Philemon Kipchumba Kisang (KEN)	1:02:14	Maria Zeferina Baldaia (BRA)	1:13:50
38th	2009	Paul Kimaiyo Kimugul (KEN)	1:01:03	Aberu Kebede (ETH)	1:08:43
39th	2010	Moses Mosop (KEN)	59:20	Jane Jepkosgei Kiptoo (KEN)	1:09:52
40th	2011	Matthew Kisorio (KEN)	1:00:03	Ababel Eyeshaneh (ETH)	1:09:54
41st	2012	Yacob Jarso (ETH)	1:01:07	Valeria Straneo (ITA)	1:08:48
42nd	2013	Kiprop Limo (KEN)	1:01:49	Pauline Kahenya (KEN)	1:11:19
43rd	2014	Thomas Lokomwa (KEN)	1:01:39	Lucy Wambui Murigi (KEN)	1:10:52
44th	2015	Thomas Lokomwa (KEN)	1:00:33	Rebecca Kangogo (KEN)	1:08:21
45th	2016	James Wangari (KEN)	59:12	Rael Nguriatukei (KEN)	1:10:19
46th	2017	Fredrick Muranga (KEN)	1:01:20	Ruth Chepngetich (KEN)	1:07:42
47th	2018	Felix Kibitok (KEN)	1:00:11	Sutume Asefa Kebede (ETH)	1:07:54
48th	2019	Vincent Raimoi (KEN)	1:00:10	Priscah Jeptoo (KEN)	1:08:27
	2020	Cancelled		Cancelled	
	2021	Cancelled		Cancelled	
49th	2022	Dickson Nyakundi (KEN)	1:03:47	Giovanna Epis (ITA)	1:11:46
50th	2023	Cosmas Mwangi (KEN)	59:40	Gladys Cherop Longari (KEN)	1:07:28
51th	2024	Antony Kimitai (KEN)	1:00:31	Anchinalu Dessie (ETH)	1:07:55
52nd	2025	Waithira Mwangi (KEN)	1:00:54	Mateiko Chebet (KEN)	1:11:19

- † = The 1989 event featured a women's 10 km race which was won by New Zealand's Mary O'Connor in a time of 34:16 minutes.
