= 2000 European Cross Country Championships =

Coordinates: 55°35′57″N 13°04′01″E

- Organisers: EAA
- Edition: 7th
- Date: 10 December
- Host city: Malmö, Sweden
- Events: 4
- Distances: 9.71 km – Men; 4.95 km – Women; 6.14 km – Junior men 3.76 km – Junior women

The 7th European Cross Country Championships were held at Malmö in Sweden on 10 December 2000. Paulo Guerra took his fourth title in the men's competition and Katalin Szentgyörgyi won the women's race.

== Results ==
=== Men individual 9.71 km ===
Pos.	Runners	Time
1st place, gold medalist(s)	(Portugal) Paulo Guerra	29:29
2nd place, silver medalist(s)	(Ukraine) Serhiy Lebid	29:39
3rd place, bronze medalist(s)	(France) Driss El Himer	29:45
4.	(France) Lyes Ramoul	29:47
5.	(France) Mustapha El Ahmadi	29:47
6.	(Spain) José Carlos Adán	29:48
7.	(Netherlands) Kamiel Maase	29:49
8.	(Belgium) Tom van Hooste	29:51
9.	(Spain) José Manuel Martínez	29:52
10.	(Republic of Ireland) Peter Matthews	29:53
11.	(France) Yann Millon	29:54
12.	(Portugal) José Ramos	29:55

=== Men teams ===
Pos.	Team	Points
1st place, gold medalist(s)	France	23
2nd place, silver medalist(s)	Spain	51
3rd place, bronze medalist(s)	Ireland	72
4.	Portugal	74
5.	Belgium	98
6.	United Kingdom	103
7.	Italy	144
8.	Russia	156

=== Women individual 4.95 km ===
Pos.	Runners	Time
1st place, gold medalist(s)	(Hungary) Katalin Szentgyörgyi	16:34
2nd place, silver medalist(s)	(Portugal) Analídia Torre	16:35
3rd place, bronze medalist(s)	(Serbia and Montenegro) Olivera Jevtić	16:39
4.	(France) Zahia Dahmani	16:49
5.	(United Kingdom) Kathy Butler	16:51
6.	(Portugal) Monica Rosa	16:55
7.	(Belgium) Anja Smolders	16:55
8.	(United Kingdom) Liz Yelling	16:55
9.	(Republic of Ireland) Anne Keenan-Buckley	16:56
10.	(Portugal) Analía Rosa	16:57
11.	(Norway) Gunhild Hanne-Haugen	16:57
12.	(Spain) Jacqueline Martin	17:00

=== Women teams ===
Pos.	Team	Points
1st place, gold medalist(s)	Portugal	18
2nd place, silver medalist(s)	United Kingdom	33
3rd place, bronze medalist(s)	Germany	54
4.	Belgium	55
5.	Romania	60
6.	Ireland	60
7.	France	60
8.	Spain	73

=== Junior men individual 6.14 km ===
Pos.	Runners	Time
1st place, gold medalist(s)	(Germany) Wolfram Müller	18:58
2nd place, silver medalist(s)	(United Kingdom) Christopher Thompson	19:00
3rd place, bronze medalist(s)	(Austria) Martin Pröll	19:05
4.	(Portugal) Rui Pedro Silva	19:10
5.	(France) Mickael André	19:11
6.	(Portugal) Bruno Silva	19:11
7.	(United Kingdom) Mo Farah	19:12
8.	(Russia) Aleksandr Sekletov	19:16

=== Junior men teams ===
Pos.	Team	Points
1st place, gold medalist(s)	Portugal	21
2nd place, silver medalist(s)	United Kingdom	25
3rd place, bronze medalist(s)	France	30
4.	Spain	48
5.	Germany	62
6.	Italy	74
7.	Sweden	85
8.	Russia	96

=== Junior women individual 3.76 km ===
Pos.	Runners	Time
1st place, gold medalist(s)	(Portugal) Jessica Augusto	12:55
2nd place, silver medalist(s)	(Switzerland) Nicola Spirig	12:56
3rd place, bronze medalist(s)	(Turkey) Elvan Can	12:56
4.	(Russia) Tatyana Chulakh	12:56
5.	(United Kingdom) Juliet Potter	13:02
6.	(Ukraine) Olha Kryvyak	13:14
7.	(United Kingdom) Jane Potter	13:14
8.	(Ukraine) Olesya Dubovik	13:15

=== Junior women teams ===
Pos.	Team	Points
1st place, gold medalist(s)	United Kingdom	21
2nd place, silver medalist(s)	Turkey	40
3rd place, bronze medalist(s)	Sweden	49
4.	Portugal	55
5.	Finland	60
6.	Ukraine	69
7.	Russia	71
8.	Romania	83
