= Rie Matsuoka =

Japanese long-distance runner

Personal information
- Born: 9 March 1977 (age 48)

Sport
- Country: Japan
- Sport: Long-distance running

Rie Matsuoka (松岡 理恵, Matuoka Rie; born 9 March 1977) is a Japanese long-distance runner. In 2001, she competed in the women's marathon at the 2001 World Championships in Athletics held in Edmonton, Alberta, Canada. She finished in 22nd place. In 2003, she competed in the women's marathon at the 2003 World Championships in Athletics held in Paris, France. She did not finish her race.

In 1996, she finished in 6th place in the women's 5000 metres at the 1996 World Junior Championships in Athletics held in Sydney, Australia. Two years later, in 1998, she won the women's half marathon at the Sanyo Women's Half Marathon held in Okayama, Japan.
