= Rose Cheruiyot =

Kenyan long-distance runner

Rose Jelagat Cheruiyot (born 21 July 1976) is a runner from Kenya. She competed in the 5000 metres at the 1996 Summer Olympics and the 2000 Summer Olympics.

She is married to Ismael Kirui. The couple completed an unusual double, when they both won their senior races at the Belfast International Cross Country in 1995.

Cheruiyot broke the 5000 metres Kenyan record in 1996, timing 14:46.41. The record was beaten in September 2000 by Leah Malot, the new record was 14:39.83.

== Achievements ==
| Year | Competition | Venue | Position | Event | Notes |
Representing Kenya
| 1994 | World XC Championships | Budapest, Hungary | 2nd | Junior race (4.3 km) | 14:05 |
| 1994 | African Junior Championships | Algiers, Algeria | 3rd | 1500 metres | 4:22.38 |
| 1994 | African Junior Championships | Algiers, Algeria | 2nd | 3000 metres | 9:04.80 |
| 1994 | World Junior Championships | Lisbon, Portugal | 4th | 1500m | 4:17.12 |
| 1995 | World XC Championships | Budapest, Hungary | 8th | Long race (6.47 km) | 20:54 |
| 1995 | All-Africa Games | Harare, Zimbabwe | 1st | 5000 metres | 15:37.9 |
| 1995 | World Championships | Gothenburg, Sweden | 7th | 5000 metres | 15:02.45 |
| 1996 | World XC Championships | Stellenbosch, South Africa | 2nd | Long race (6.3 km) | 20:18 |
| 1996 | Olympics | Atlanta, USA | 8th | 5000 metres | 15:17.33 |
| 2000 | World XC Championships | Vilamoura, Portugal | 12th | Short race (4.18 km) | 13:22 |
| 2000 | Olympics | Sydney, Australia | 11th | 5000 metres | 14:58.07 |
| 2001 | World XC Championships | Ostend, Belgium | 8th | Short race (4.1 km) | 15:07 |
| 2001 | World Championships | Edmonton, Canada | 9th | 5000 metres | 15:23.18 |
| 2002 | World XC Championships | Dublin, Ireland | 8th | Long race (7.974 km) | 27:28 |
| 2006 | Amsterdam Marathon | Amsterdam, Netherlands | 1st | Marathon | 2:28.26 |
| 2007 | World Championships | Osaka, Japan | 24th | Marathon | 2:38:56 |

=== Road running and marathons ===
- 2001 Zevenheuvelenloop – 1st
- 2002 Berlin Half Marathon – 1st
- 2005 Saint Silvester Road Race – 2nd
- 2005 Portugal Half Marathon – 1st
- 2006 Hamburg Marathon – 2nd
- 2006 Amsterdam Marathon – 1st
- 2007 Seoul International Marathon – 2nd
- 2007 Great South Run – 1st
- 2008 Dubai Marathon – 4th

=== Other achievements ===
- 1994/95 IAAF World Cross Challenge – 2nd
- 1995/96 IAAF World Cross Challenge – 1st
- 2001 Cross Internacional de Soria winner

== Personal best ==
| Distance | Time | Date | City |
|---|---|---|---|
| 1,500 m | 4:13.05 | May 23, 2000 | Nijmegen |
| 3,000 m | 8:39.88 | August 18, 2000 | Monaco |
| 5,000 m | 14:46.41 | August 16, 1996 | Cologne |
| 10 km | 31:43 | September 18, 2005 | Zaandam |
| 10 km | 31:43 | March 31, 2002 | La Courneuve |
| 15 km | 48:00 | November 20, 2005 | Nijmegen |
| 20 km | 1:08:09 | April 23, 2006 | Hamburg |
| Half Marathon | 1:09.32 | April 7, 2002 | Berlin |
| 25 km | 1:24:46 | May 8, 2005 | Berlin |
| 30 km | 1:43:19 | April 23, 2006 | Hamburg |
| Marathon | 2:25:48 | January 18, 2008 | Dubai |

== Personal life ==
Cheruiyot's younger sister, Pasca Myers, a Seminole two-time runner up at the NCAA D-I Cross Country Championships, cites Rose's positive influence in her collegiate and post-collegiate running career.
