= 1996 World Junior Championships in Athletics – Women's 5000 metres =

The women's 5000 metres event at the 1996 World Junior Championships in Athletics was held in Sydney, Australia, at International Athletic Centre on 23 and 25 August.

== Medalists ==
Gold	Ayelech Worku; Ethiopia
Silver	Olivera Jevtić; Yugoslavia
Bronze	Cristina Iloc; Romania

== Results ==
=== Final ===
25 August

Rank	Name	Nationality	Time	Notes
1st place, gold medalist(s)	Ayelech Worku	Ethiopia	15:40.03	
2nd place, silver medalist(s)	Olivera Jevtić	Yugoslavia	15:40.59	
3rd place, bronze medalist(s)	Cristina Iloc	Romania	15:41.44	
4	Etaferahu Tarekegn	Ethiopia	15:46.68	
5	Jepkorir Ayabei	Kenya	15:58.15	
6	Rie Matsuoka	Japan	15:58.96	
7	Sun Guanghong	China	16:13.40	
8	Prisca Ngetich	Kenya	16:20.39	
9	Charlotte Audier	France	16:20.60	
10	Sara Ferrari	Italy	16:23.70	
11	Anikó Kálovics	Hungary	16:28.33	
12	Galina Bogomolova	Russia	16:32.51	
13	Katalin Szentgyörgyi	Hungary	16:35.50	
14	Ulrike Maisch	Germany	17:18.17	
	Tri Asih Handayani	Indonesia	DNF	

=== Heats ===
23 August

==== Heat 1 ====
Rank	Name	Nationality	Time	Notes
1	Etaferahu Tarekegn	Ethiopia	16:26.53	Q
2	Prisca Ngetich	Kenya	16:29.53	Q
3	Olivera Jevtić	Yugoslavia	16:32.12	Q
4	Charlotte Audier	France	16:33.69	Q
5	Sun Guanghong	China	16:34.40	Q
6	Anikó Kálovics	Hungary	16:43.19	q
7	Monica Martel	Mexico	16:56.29	
8	Ari Ichihashi	Japan	17:02.92	
9	Sudragni Rumini	Indonesia	17:25.74	
10	Ekateríni Fotopoúlou	Greece	17:34.74	
11	Casi Florida	United States	17:37.55	
12	Fabiane Cristine da Silva	Brazil	17:52.10	

==== Heat 2 ====
Rank	Name	Nationality	Time	Notes
1	Ayelech Worku	Ethiopia	16:02.43	Q
2	Jepkorir Ayabei	Kenya	16:02.65	Q
3	Rie Matsuoka	Japan	16:14.07	Q
4	Cristina Iloc	Romania	16:16.82	Q
5	Sara Ferrari	Italy	16:25.73	Q
6	Galina Bogomolova	Russia	16:34.02	q
7	Ulrike Maisch	Germany	16:41.32	q
8	Katalin Szentgyörgyi	Hungary	16:46.70	q
9	Tri Asih Handayani	Indonesia	16:54.51	q
10	Amy Yoder	United States	16:57.31	
11	Justine Nahimana	Burundi	17:13.92	
12	Veronique Bingouma	Gabon	19:08.75	

== Participation ==
According to an unofficial count, 24 athletes from 18 countries participated in the event.

- Brazil (1)
- Burundi (1)
- China (1)
- Ethiopia (2)
- France (1)
- Gabon (1)
- Germany (1)
- Greece (1)
- Hungary (2)
- Indonesia (2)
- Italy (1)
- Japan (2)
- Kenya (2)
- Mexico (1)
- Romania (1)
- Russia (1)
- United States (2)
- Yugoslavia (1)
