= Riwo =

Village in Baringo County, Kenya

Riwo is a village near Kabarnet in the Baringo County, Kenya. It is part of Kabarnet municipality.

It is the birthplace of famous Kenyan runner Paul Tergat. The local primary school is supported by the World Food Programme.

== Other places called Riwo ==
There is also a village called Riwo in West Pokot County and Trans-Nzoia County.
