= Abderrahim Zitouna =

Moroccan long-distance runner

Medal record

Men's athletics

Representing Morocco

World Cross Country Championships
Silver medal – second place	1996 Cape Town	Long race – Team

Abderrahim Zitouna (born 20 December 1970) is a retired Moroccan long-distance runner. He specialized in the 10,000 metres and cross-country running.

On the track, Zitouna won the silver medal at the 1997 Mediterranean Games and finished thirteenth at the 1997 World Championships. His personal best time was 27.36.73 minutes, achieved in May 1997 in Hengelo.

Zitouna also competed at the World Cross Country Championships in 1992, 1995, 1996 and 1997. His best result came in 1996 when he finished thirteenth in the long race and won a silver medal with the Moroccan team.

Along with track and cross country running, he also took part in road races in his career. He won the 1990 edition of the Giro al Sas 10K in Trento.
