= 2005 Saint Silvester Road Race =

2005 official logo.

The 2005 Saint Silvester Road Race (Portuguese: Corrida Internacional de São Silvestre de 2005) was the 81st edition of the Saint Silvester Road Race and held in São Paulo, Brazil, on December 31, 2005. The distance ran by the participating athletes was 15 km.

The men's race was won by Brazil's Marilson Gomes dos Santos, his second victory, whereas the women's event was won by Serbia and Montenegro's Olivera Jevtic, her second triumph.

The podiums were composed of the first seven men and the first five women. The winners of both the men's event and the women's event received each a money prize of 21 thousand reais (approximately US$9 thousand).

For the amateur athletes participating (over 15 thousand in the men's event), there was an enrollment fee of 55 reais (US$23,50).

== Men ==
Position	Athlete	Nationality	Time
1	Marílson Gomes dos Santos	Brazil	44min21s
2	Robert Kipkoech Cheruiyot	Kenya	45min17s
3	Patrick Ivuti	Kenya	45min30s
4	Rômulo Wagner da Silva	Brazil	45min32s
5	Nigusse Ketema	Ethiopia	45min36s
6	Mathew Cheboi	Kenya	45min53s
7	Alan Wendell Bonfim Silva	Brazil	46min01s
8	Elenilson da Silva	Brazil	46min09s
9	Elijah Kipkemboi Yator	Kenya	46min13s
10	John Kiprotich Chemisto	Kenya	47min05s
11	Ubiratan José dos Santos	Brazil	47min13s
12	José Cícero Eloy	Brazil	47min14s
13	Cyrus Chelanga Kataron	Kenya	47min18s
14	Vanderlei Cordeiro de Lima	Brazil	47min24s
15	Salin Kimutai Kipsang	Kenya	47min31s

== Women ==
Position	Athlete	Nationality	Time
1	Olivera Jevtić	Serbia and Montenegro	51min38s
2	Rose Cheruiyot	Kenya	51min47s
3	Bizunish Bekele	Ethiopia	52min02s
4	Lucélia de Oliveira Peres	Brazil	52min10s
5	Berta Sanchez	Colombia	52min59s
6	Marizete de Paula Rezende	Brazil	53min20s
7	Sirlene Sousa de Pinho	Brazil	53min59s
8	Margaret Karie Toroitich	Kenya	54min59s
9	Marizete Moreira dos Santos	Brazil	55min23s
10	Maria Cristina Bernardo Vaqueiro Ro	Brazil	55min27s

== See also ==
- 2005 in athletics (track and field)
