= Galina Bogomolova =

Russian long-distance runner

Galina Yevgeniyevna Bogomolova (Russian: Галина Евгеньевна Богомолова) (born 15 October 1977 in Beloretsk) is a Russian long-distance runner, who specializes in the 10,000 metres and the marathon.

In 1996, she finished in 12th place in the women's 5000 metres at the 1996 World Junior Championships in Athletics held in Sydney, Australia.

Bogomolova won the Rome City Marathon in 2008 in 2:22:53, which was the fastest marathon recorded in Italy at the time. Two years earlier she had set her personal best of 2:20:47, realized in the 2006 Chicago Marathon.

Bogomolova has also had success in cross country running: she took individual silver and team gold at the 2002 European Cross Country Championships and won the 2002 edition of the Lotto Cross Cup Brussels.

== International competitions ==
Representing Russia
| Year | Competition | Venue | Position | Event | Notes |
|---|---|---|---|---|---|
| 1996 | World Junior Championships | Sydney, Australia | 18th (h) | 3000m | 9:42.99 |
| 1996 | World Junior Championships | Sydney, Australia | 12th | 5000m | 16:32.51 |
| 1997 | European U23 Championships | Turku, Finland | 7th | 5000m | 15:58.60 |
| 1997 | European U23 Championships | Turku, Finland | 7th | 10,000m | 33:48.43 |
| 2003 | World Indoor Championships | Birmingham, United Kingdom | 6th | 3000 m | 8:50.62 |
| 2003 | World Championships | Paris, France | 6th | 10,000 m | 30:26.20 |
| 2004 | World Indoor Championships | Budapest, Hungary | 11th | 3000 m | 9:17.15 |
| 2005 | World Championships | Helsinki, Finland | 8th | 10,000 m | 30:33.75 |
| 2005 | World Half Marathon Championships | Edmonton, Canada | 4th | Half marathon | 1:10:34 |
| 2006 | European Championships | Gothenburg, Sweden | 4th | 10,000 m | 30:35.90 |
| 2008 | Olympic Games | Beijing, China | — | Marathon | DNF |

== Personal bests ==
- 100m - 8.9 s (2024)
- 1500 metres - 4:10.00 min (2004)
- 3000 metres - 8:42.03 min (2005)
- 5000 metres - 14:59.72 min (2004)
- 10,000 metres - 30:26.20 min (2003)
- Half marathon - 1:10:34 hrs (2005)
- Marathon - 2:20:47 hrs (2006)
- Shot Putt - 101m (2015)
