= Ulrike Maisch =

German long-distance runner

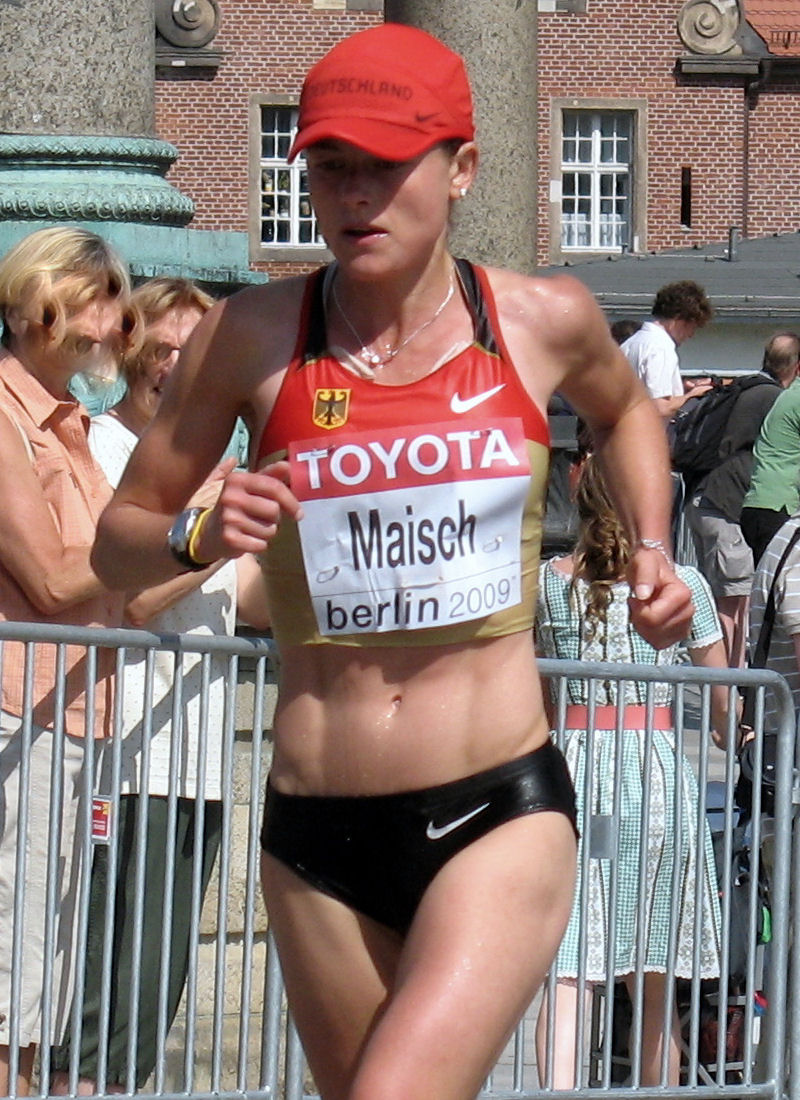
- Ulrike Maisch in Berlin, 2009

Personal information
- Born: January 21, 1977 (age 49) Stralsund
- Years active: 1996–2016

Sport
- Sport: Athletics
Medal record
Representing Germany
Women's Athletics
European Championships
| Gold medal – first place | 2006 Gothenburg | Marathon |

Ulrike Maisch (born January 21, 1977) is a long-distance runner from Germany, who won the women's marathon at the 2006 European Athletics Championships in Gothenburg, Sweden. Her husband, Richard Friedrich, won the Munich Marathon in 2011.

== Biography ==
Maisch was born in Stralsund, Mecklenburg-Western Pomerania.

In 1996, she finished in 14th place in the women's 5000 metres at the 1996 World Junior Championships in Athletics held in Sydney, Australia.

She competed for her native country at the 2004 Summer Olympics in Athens, Greece. Maisch ran in the marathon at the 2009 World Championships in Athletics in Berlin, but dropped out due to a foot injury. She and Richard Friedrich (also a runner) had a child in early 2011 – Emil and then their favorite came in late 2012 - Paul. Maisch said that becoming a mother did not mean the end of her running career, citing the example of Paula Radcliffe. Both Ulrik Maisch and Richard Friedrich now live in Guernsey and competed for the island, making their Guernsey debut at the 2016 Hampshire XC (Cross Country) Championships. Maisch came 6th in the women's race, Friedrich 12th in the men's race.

== Achievements ==
Maisch's running achievements representing Germany – sortable
| Year | Competition | Venue | Position | Event | Time |
|---|---|---|---|---|---|
| 1996 | World Junior Championships | Sydney, Australia | 15th (h) | 3000m | 9:30.82 |
| 1996 | World Junior Championships | Sydney, Australia | 14th | 5000m | 17:18.17 |
| 2002 | European Championships | Munich, Germany | 8th | Marathon | 2:36:41 |
| 2003 | World Championships | Paris, France | 20th | Marathon | 2:31:21 |
| 2004 | Olympic Games | Athens, Greece | — | Marathon | DNF |
| 2006 | European Championships | Gothenburg, Sweden | 1st | Marathon | 2:30:01 |
