= Christopher Kelong =

Kenyan long-distance runner

Christopher Kelong (born 10 December 1976) is a Kenyan male long-distance runner. He twice represented his country at the IAAF World Cross Country Championships, placing tenth in the junior race in 1995 and sixth in the senior race in 1998. Such was Kenya's dominance at the latter event, he did not make the top four Kenyans to score points for the national team.

Outside of international competitions, he was third at the Great Edinburgh Run in 1995, won the 1996 Swansea Bay 10K. He won the Edinburgh race two years in a row in 1996 and 1997 and also took the Great South Run in the latter year. The 1998 season was his last on the roads, and he was winner of the Puy-en-Velay 15K that year.

== International competitions ==
Year	Competition	Venue	Position	Event	Notes
1995	World Cross Country Championships	Durham, United Kingdom	10th	Junior race	25:02
1998	World Cross Country Championships	Marrakesh, Morocco	6th	Senior race	34:41
