= Anikó Kálovics =

Hungarian long-distance runner

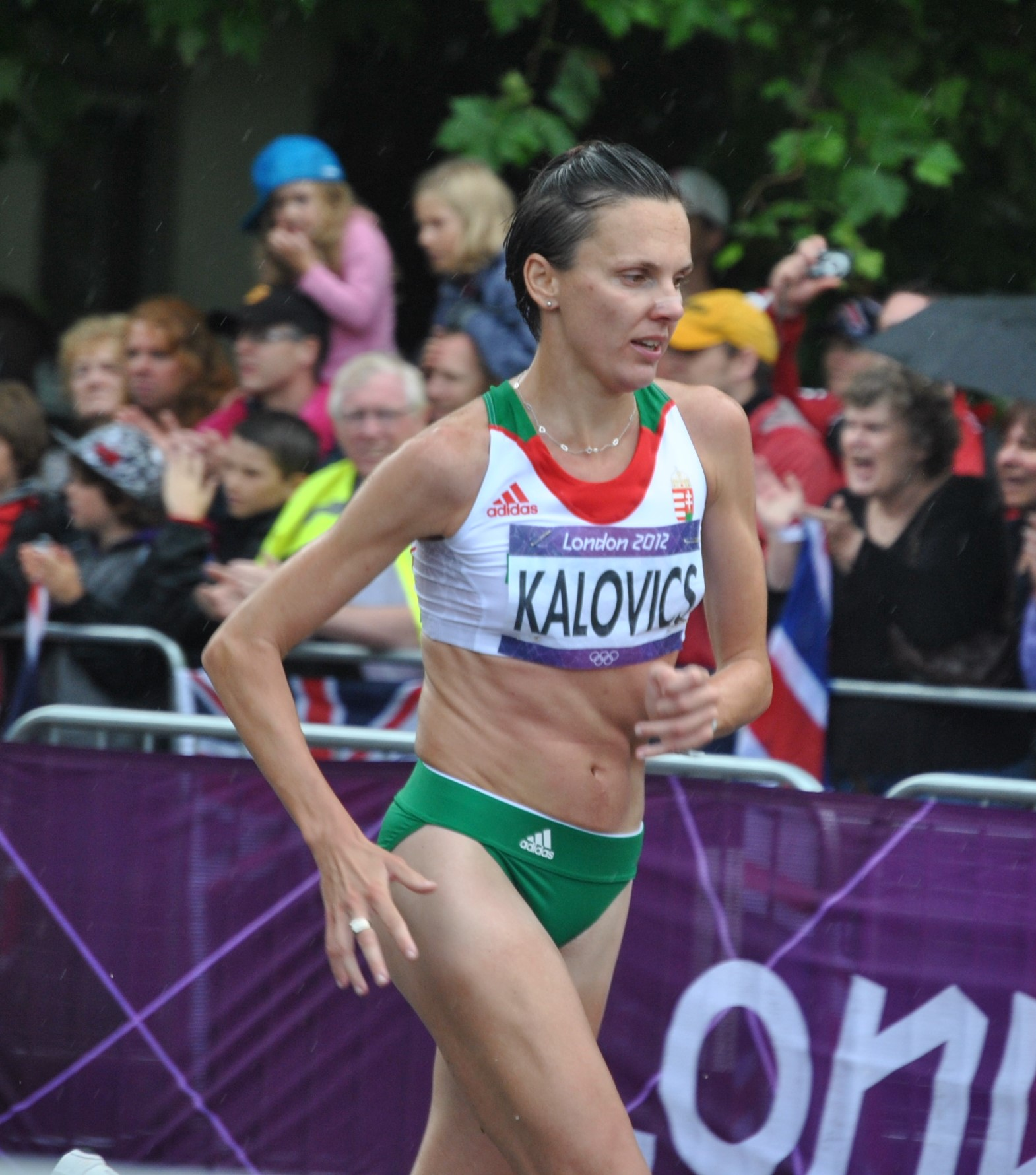
- Kálovics competing at the 2012 Summer Olympics

Personal information
- Born: May 13, 1977 (age 49)
- Height: 1.75 m (5 ft 9 in)
- Weight: 58 kg (128 lb)

Sport
- Country: Hungary
- Sport: Athletics
- Event: Marathon

Anikó Kálovics (born 13 May 1977) is a Hungarian runner who specializes in the 10,000 metres and the marathon. She is a four-time Olympian (2000–2012) and has won both the Venice Marathon and Italian Marathon.

== Career ==
She was born in Szombathely, and represents the club Haladás Vasutas Sportegyesület. In 1996, she finished in 11th place in the women's 5000 metres at the 1996 World Junior Championships in Athletics held in Sydney, Australia. In the 10,000 metres she finished eighth at the 1998 European Championships, competed at the 2000 Olympic Games and finished fourteenth at the 2002 European Championships. She also finished 37th at the 2001 World Half Marathon Championships. She then finished 20th at the 2003 World Championships and the 2004 Olympic Games, both in the 10,000 metres. She also won the bronze medal at the 2003 European Cross Country Championships.

By 2004 she had achieved her lifetime bests in all her track events: 9:08.24 minutes in the 3000 metres, achieved in September 2004 in Trento; 15:10.21 minutes in the 5000 metres, achieved in July 2004 at the Crystal Palace National Sports Centre; and 31:40.31 minutes in the 10,000 metres, achieved in July 2003 in Watford. The latter time is a Hungarian record.

She began to develop as a road runner, taking three victories in four years between 2003 and 2007 at the Budapest Half Marathon. She still continued with track running, however, and competed at the 2005 World Championships without reaching the final, finished eleventh at the 2006 World Road Running Championships and in the 10,000 metres she finished 22nd at the 2008 Olympic Games. She was a prominent competitor on the Italian road running circuit and won over a number of competitions and distances: a 2005 win at the Stramilano Half Marathon grew into a three-year undefeated streak and she won both the Italian Marathon and BOclassic in 2006, as well as a cross country win at the Cinque Mulini. She repeated as champion at the Italian Marathon in 2007 and was the 2008 winner of the Venice Marathon.

Kálovics ran in the 5000 m at the 2010 European Athletics Championships and finished in tenth position. She found greater success on the roads and at the Corribianco race in Italy in August she edged out Meriyem Lamachi to take the victory. The following month she was fourth at the Dam tot Damloop in Zaandam, missing out on a podium place to Mestawet Tufa. As preparation for the Frankfurt Marathon, she ran at the 10-mile Great South Run and took third place on the podium after setting a quick pace for the competition. The pace in Frankfurt proved too fast for Kálovics as she finished in tenth place, seven minutes behind the winner.

At the Campaccio cross in January 2011, she won a third consecutive title at the high-profile race. Two weeks prior to the World Cross Championships, she won at the Almond Blossom Cross Country in Portugal.

In road running her personal best times are 49:16 minutes in the 15 kilometres, achieved in October 2010 in Portsmouth; 1:06:20 hours in the 20 kilometres, achieved at the 2006 World Road Running Championships in Debrecen; 1:08:59 hours in the half marathon, achieved in April 2007 in Milan; and 2:29:04 hours in the marathon, achieved in March 2008 in Rome. The first three results are Hungarian records.

== Achievements ==
- All results regarding marathon, unless stated otherwise

Year	Competition	Venue	Position	Event	Notes
Representing Hungary
1996	World Junior Championships	Sydney, Australia	13th (h)	3000m	9:28.88
1996	World Junior Championships	Sydney, Australia	11th	5000m	16:28.33
1997	European U23 Championships	Turku, Finland	4th	10,000m	33:27.41
2006	Italian Marathon	Carpi, Italy	1st	Marathon	2:26:43
2007	Italian Marathon	Carpi, Italy	1st	Marathon	2:28:17
2008	Venice Marathon	Venice, Italy	1st	Marathon	2:31.24

== Awards ==
- Hungarian athlete of the Year (1): 2008
