= Paul Tergat =

Kenyan long-distance runner (born 1969)

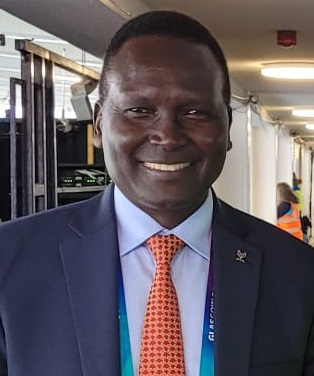
- Paul Tergat at the 2026 Commonwealth Games in Glasgow, Scotland

Medal record

Men's athletics

Representing Kenya

Olympic Games
Silver medal – second place	1996 Atlanta	10,000 m
Silver medal – second place	2000 Sydney	10,000 m

World Championships
Silver medal – second place	1997 Athens	10,000 m
Silver medal – second place	1999 Sevilla	10,000 m
Bronze medal – third place	1995 Gothenburg	10,000 m

World Cross Country Championships
Gold medal – first place	1995 Durham	Long race
Gold medal – first place	1996 Stellenbosch	Long race
Gold medal – first place	1997 Turin	Long race
Gold medal – first place	1998 Marrakesh	Long race
Gold medal – first place	1999 Belfast	Long race
Bronze medal – third place	2000 Vilamoura	Long race

World Half Marathon Championships
Gold medal – first place	1999 Palermo	Half marathon
Gold medal – first place	2000 Veracruz	Half marathon

Paul Kibii Tergat (born 17 June 1969) is a Kenyan former professional long-distance runner. He became the first Kenyan man to set the world record in the marathon in 2003, with a time of 2:04:55, and is regarded as one of the most accomplished long-distance runners of all time. Runnerworld called him the "Most comprehensive runner of all time".

Towards the end of his career, he concentrated exclusively on the marathon. Tergat set several world records and won many titles on the track, in cross country, and on the road. He lives and trains in Eldoret, Kenya.

== Early life ==
Paul Tergat was born on 17 June 1969 in Riwo, Baringo District, in Kenya's Rift Valley Province. He attended Riwo Primary School and later joined Kapkawa Boys High School. Unlike many athletes, Tergat realised his talent after graduating from high school.

== Career ==
Tergat won five straight IAAF World Cross Country Championships titles, 1995 to 1999, which was a record. Says Tergat, "Cross country is what I always liked most. It was my world, my passion. Before the IAAF introduced the short course in 1998, all the world class athletes from 1500 m to the marathon were in the same race."

He won the Lisbon Half Marathon in 2000, setting a new course record and personal best of 59:06. He won the race again in 2005 with a time of 59:10. Tergat's achievements also include 5 victories in the traditional Saint Silvester Road Race, the most important event in Latin American street racing. He holds the record for the present 15 km distance, which he established in 1995. His performances in the Saint Silvester race earned him celebrity status in Brazil.

He has had an intense rivalry with his friend Haile Gebrselassie of Ethiopia. In the Olympic Games 10,000m finals of both the 1996 Atlanta Olympics and the 2000 Sydney Olympics, he was defeated by Gebrselassie by slim margins. In 2000, the margin of victory was only nine-hundredths of a second.

Tergat finished second to Gebrselassie in the 1997 and 1999 World Championships in Athletics at 10,000 m, and finished third in the 1995 version of that race, behind Gebrselassie and Moroccan Khalid Skah.

On the track, Tergat broke Gebrselassie's 10,000-metre world record on 22 August 1997 in Brussels with a time of 26:27.85 minutes. The record was broken again by Gebrselassie in 1998 (time 26:22:75), but Tergat's time remains a Kenyan record (as of 2024). On the road, Tergat broke the half marathon world record on 4 April 1998 in Milan by running in 59:17 minutes. (Tergat had run 58:51 minutes at the Stramilano half marathon in 1996, but a misplaced cone made the course slightly too short and no record was allowed.) The previous record, 59:47 minutes was set by Moses Tanui in 1993. Tergat's world record was broken in 2005 by Samuel Wanjiru, another Kenyan.

When Tergat raced Gebrselassie in the London Marathon in 2002, it was Tergat who beat Gebrselassie; Tergat was in second place behind then world record holder Khalid Khannouchi. The three runners raced again in the 2007 version with Tergat being the only one of them to finish.

He became an IOC member at the 125th IOC Session in Buenos Aires in September 2013.

=== Marathon career ===
Tergat finished second in his first three marathons: London Marathon in 2001 and 2002 and Chicago Marathon in 2001. He continued marathoning by two fourth places: Chicago 2002 and London 2003.

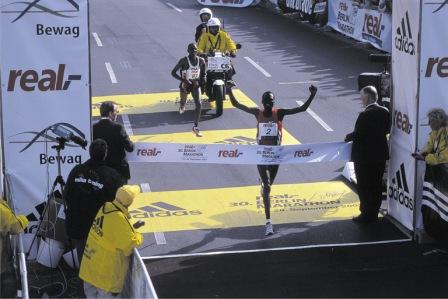
Tergat setting a new world record to the marathon at Berlin, 2003.

He set the marathon world record of 2:04:55, on 28 September 2003 at the Berlin Marathon. That is an average pace of 0:02:57 per kilometre (20.3 km/h) or 0:04:46 per mile (12.6 MPH). In his world record race, Tergat badly abraded his foot. He later said it felt like the sole of his shoe fell off. He also took a momentary wrong turn near the finish. Tergat's countryman Sammy Korir, who was a pacesetter for the race, nearly caught up to him. Korir took second place in 2:04:56, then the second-fastest marathon performance in history. Tergat's world record was broken in 2007 by Haile Gebrselassie of Ethiopia. Tergat's time remained the Kenyan record until 2009, when winner Duncan Kibet and 2nd placed James Kwambai both timed 2:04:27 at the Rotterdam Marathon

Tergat won the New York City Marathon 6 November 2005, in a thrilling sprint finish through New York's Central Park, prevailing over defending champion Hendrick Ramaala 2:09:29.90 to 2:09:30.22.

That year, Tergat inaugurated the Baringo Half Marathon, setting up the professional race on a course near his home town.

A week prior to the London Marathon on 23 April 2006, Tergat pulled a calf muscle. Calling the injury "cruel," he was forced to withdraw from the star-studded race, which would have featured a long-awaited showdown with Haile Gebrselassie. The race was won by Felix Limo of Kenya.

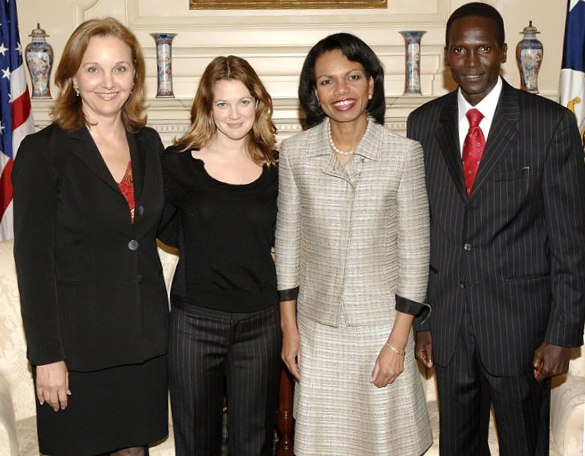
Tergat, Josette Sheeran Shiner and Drew Barrymore meet with Condoleezza Rice

Marílson Gomes dos Santos won the 2006 New York City Marathon; Tergat finished third. Gomes made a move at mile 19 and Tergat did not respond. Tergat steadily closed the gap over the final five miles.

Tergat finished sixth (2:08:06) at the 2007 London Marathon in April 2007. The entry list was competitive, including Ethiopian legend Haile Gebrselassie, who dropped out just past the 30-K mark. Kenya's Martin Lel won the race in a time of 2:07.42, after a dramatic, gutsy finish.

On 30 September 2007 Ethiopian long-distance runner Haile Gebrselassie broke Tergat's record marathon time of 2:04.55, finishing the Berlin Marathon in 2:04:26. Moments after finishing the race, Gebrselassie apologised to his friend Tergat for breaking the record, during a congratulatory phone call. Gebrselassie later explained "I am sorry – this record belonged to Paul Tergat," Gebrselassie told a news conference when asked about the phone call. "Paul is my friend."

He expressed a desire to compete in 2008 Olympics, but was not selected to represent Kenya. He finished 4th in the New York Marathon later that year.

In 2009, he won the Lake Biwa Marathon in Japan, timing 2:10:22. In October 2009, he was the guest of honour at the relaunch of the Belgrade Race Through History. Although he never won the competition in the late 1990s, he was the only competitor to run in all of the first four editions and never finished outside of the top three. He stated his desire to close his career at the race and praised the way it promoted Serbia's cultural heritage.

He was named by New York Road Runners as the recipient of the 2010 Abebe Bikila Award in recognition of his long-distance achievements, becoming the first Kenyan male winner. In his acceptance he said "The history of marathon running is incomplete without the solid and indelible mark of the late Abebe Bikila's contribution, and I am so proud to be associated [with this]".

== International competitions ==
- 1995
  - Gold medal, 1995 IAAF World Cross Country Championships
  - Bronze medal, 1995 World Championships in Athletics 10,000 m
- 1996
  - Silver medal, 1996 Summer Olympics 10,000 m
  - Gold medal, 1996 IAAF World Cross Country Championships
- 1997
  - Gold medal, 1997 IAAF World Cross Country Championships
  - Silver medal, 1997 World Championships in Athletics 10,000 m
- 1998
  - Gold medal, 1998 IAAF World Cross Country Championships
  - Gold medal, IAAF World Half Marathon Championships
- 1999
  - Gold medal, 1999 IAAF World Cross Country Championships
  - Silver medal, 1999 World Championships in Athletics 10,000 m
  - Gold medal, IAAF World Half Marathon Championships
- 2000
  - Bronze medal, 2000 IAAF World Cross Country Championships
  - Silver medal, 2000 Summer Olympics 10,000 m
  - Gold medal, IAAF World Half Marathon Championships
- 2004
  - 10th, 2004 Summer Olympics Marathon

== Personal bests ==
"+" indicates mark set en route during a longer race
"a" indicates course slightly downhill

Distance	Mark	Date	Location
3000 m	7:28.70	1996-08-10	Monaco
5000 m	12:49.87	1997-08-13	Zurich
10,000 m	26:27.85	1997-08-22	Brussels
10 km (road)	27:45+	2006-03-26	Lisbon
15 km (road)	42:04+	1998-04-04	Milan
Ten miles (road)	45:12+	1998-04-04	Milan
20 km (road)	56:18+	1998-04-04	Milan
Half marathon	59:06a	2000-03-26	Lisbon
30 km (road)	1:29:00+	2002-04-14	London
Marathon	2:04:55	2003-09-28	Berlin

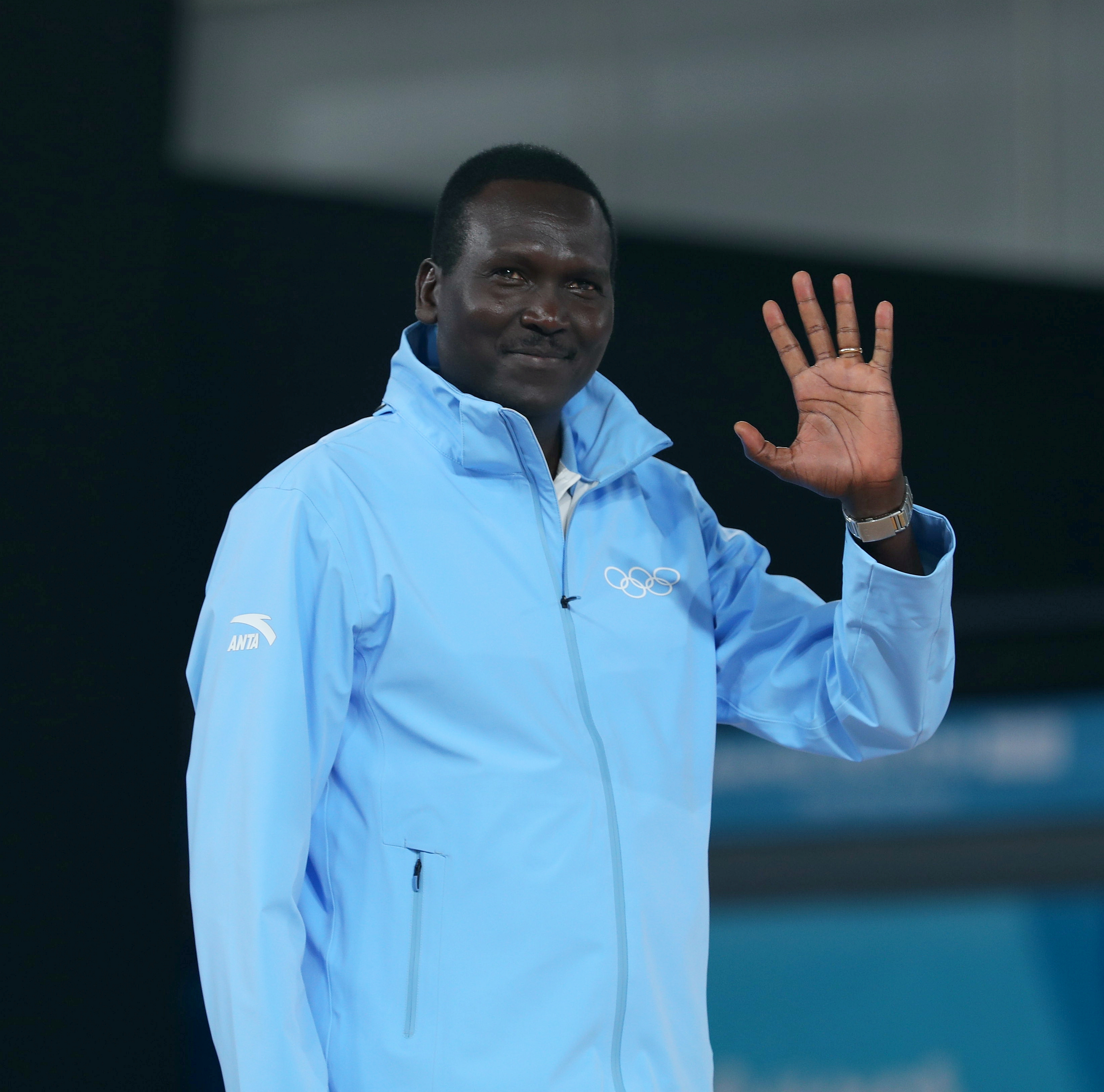
Tergat in his function as IOC member at the 2018 Summer Youth Olympics

== Other activities ==
In January 2004 Tergat was named a UN World Food Programme (WFP) "Ambassador Against Hunger". When he was a child, Paul Tergat's family was too poor to send him to school with food. According to Tergat, he would not have gotten a full education were it not for the World Food Program, which provided lunch at his school.

Tergat set up the Paul Tergat Foundation in 2005. It is meant to help disadvantaged Kenyan sportspeople. He runs a Sports Marketing and PR company known as Fine Touch Communications (organises the annual Sportsman of the Year Awards in Kenya in conjunction with Safaricom, a leading mobile telephony provider in Kenya.

Like many other Kenyan athletes, Tergat is enlisted to Armed Forces. He is based at the Moi Air Base in Nairobi.

As of April 2015, Tergat was linked with the role of leading a new interim committee to oversee Athletics Kenya (AK) after rumours surfaced that the Sports Cabinet Secretary, Hassan Wario, would soon dissolve AK.

Olympic Games
Preceded by Patrick Sang	Flagbearer for Kenya; Atlanta 1996	Succeeded by Philip Boit
Records
Preceded by (Kenya) Moses Tanui	Men's Half Marathon World Record Holder; 4 April 1998 – 11 September 2005	Succeeded by (Kenya) Samuel Wanjiru
Preceded by Haile Gebrselassie	Men's 10,000 m World Record Holder; 22 August 1997 – 1 June 1998	Succeeded by Haile Gebrselassie
Preceded by (Morocco) Khalid Khannouchi	Men's Marathon World Record Holder; 28 September 2003 – 30 September 2007	Succeeded by (Ethiopia) Haile Gebrselassie
Sporting positions
Preceded by Shem Kororia	Men's Half Marathon Best Year Performance; 1998–1999	Succeeded by Kenichi Takahashi
