= Dalibor Balgač =

Croatian retired track athlete

Personal information
- Nationality: Croatian
- Born: September 22, 1977 (age 48) Zagreb, Croatia

Sport
- Sport: Track, long-distance running
- Event: 800-5000 meters
- College team: Southern Methodist

Achievements and titles
- Personal best(s): 800m: 1:47.30; 1500m: 3:38.34; 3000m: 7:53.90; 5000m: 13:37.76

Dalibor Balgač (born September 22, 1977) is a Croatian retired track athlete who specialized in events ranging from the 800 meters to 5000 meters. He competed for Southern Methodist University and for Croatia internationally.

== Running career ==
=== Youth ===
In 1993, Balgač broke the 2000 meter world record for the age of 15 previously held by Tim Butt, recording a time of 5:25.69. It stood for 22 years until 2015 when it was broken by Jakob Ingebrigtsen in a margin of 0.28 seconds. He made his international cross country debut at the 1994 IAAF World Cross Country Championships, where he finished in 134th place in the junior men's race. He placed among the top 25 in the junior men's race at the 1996 IAAF World Cross Country Championships. Later that year, he finished in ninth place in the men's 1500 meters at the 1996 World Junior Championships in Athletics.

=== Collegiate ===
Balgač was recruited by Southern Methodist University, where he qualified for multiple NCAA Championships. At the 2003 NCAA DI Indoor Track and Field Championships, he ran the 3000 meters and the 1600-meter leg in Southern Methodist's DMR team. He finished in tenth place in the men's 3000 meters with a time of 8:03.91. He helped his team finish in fourth in the distance medley relay with a time of 9:33.46. On April 23, 2001, he finished in seventh in the men's mile at the Mt. SAC Relays, recording a time of 4:02.75.
