= Sara Ferrari (runner) =

Italian marathon runner

Personal information
- Nationality: Italian
- Born: 30 September 1977 (age 48)

Sport
- Country: Italy
- Sport: Athletics
- Event: Marathon

Achievements and titles
- Personal best: Marathon: 2:29:46 (2001)

Sara Ferrari (born 30 September 1977) is an Italian retired female marathon runner, which participated at the 2001 World Championships in Athletics. She competed in the women's marathon and she finished in 26th place.

In 1996, she finished in 10th place in the women's 5000 metres at the 1996 World Junior Championships in Athletics held in Sydney, Australia.

== Achievements ==
Year	Competition	Venue	Position	Event	Time	Notes
2001	World Championships	(Canada) Edmonton	26th	Marathon	2:36:07	
