= John Morapedi =

South African long-distance runner

Personal information
- Full name: John Sello Morapedi
- Nationality: South African
- Born: 30 November 1976 (age 49)

Sport
- Sport: Long-distance running
- Event: 5000 metres

John Selo Morapedi (born 30 November 1976) is a South African long-distance runner. He competed in heat three of the men's 5000 metres at the 1996 Summer Olympics in Atlanta.
