= Mark Bett =

Kenyan long-distance runner

Mark Bett Kipkinyor (born 22 December 1976) is a Kenyan long-distance runner who specializes in the 3000 and 5000 metres. His time over 5000 m of 12:58.72 minutes in 2001, achieved in Zürich, was the third best time in the world that season, only behind Richard Limo and Hailu Mekonnen. He is also the world record holder in the indoor 10,000 meters with a time of 27:50.29 in February 2002.

== Achievements ==
| Year | Competition | Venue | Position | Notes |
Representing Kenya
| 2002 | African Championships | Radès, Tunisia | 11th | 5000 m |
| 2002 | IAAF Grand Prix Final | Paris, France | 3rd | 3000 m |
| 2004 | World Athletics Final | Monte Carlo, Monaco | 5th | 3000 m |
| 2005 | World Athletics Final | Monte Carlo, Monaco | 10th | 3000 m |
| 2006 | World Athletics Final | Stuttgart, Germany | 10th | 3000 m |

=== Personal bests ===
- 3000 metres - 7:36.66 min (2001)
- 5000 metres - 12:55.63 min (2000)
- 10,000 metres - 26:52.93 min (2005)
- Half marathon - 1:02:54 hrs (2006)
- 10,000 metres - world record holder- indoor
