= Mizan Mehari =

Australian long-distance runner

Personal information
- Nationality: Australian
- Born: Mizan Mehari; 28 January 1980 Addis Ababa, Socialist Ethiopia
- Died: 10 May 2007 (aged 27) Mount Ainslie, ACT, Australia
- Height: 1.69 m (5 ft 6 1/2 in)
- Weight: 57 kg (126 lb)

Sport
- Country: Ethiopia / Australia
- Sport: Athletics
- Event: 5000 metres

Mizan Mehari (28 January 1980 – 10 May 2007) was an Ethiopian born Australian athlete who competed in long-distance running events. He represented Australia at the 2000 Summer Olympics in Sydney.

== Junior career ==
Mehari was originally from Addis Ababa and represented Ethiopia in junior athletics. He placed fifth in the junior race at the 1996 IAAF World Cross Country Championships.

=== Asylum ===
After competing in Sydney at the 1996 World Junior Championships in Athletics, Mehari was one of four Ethiopians to seek political asylum in Australia, saying they faced ethnic discrimination back home and the threat of death or imprisonment. He ended up moving to Canberra and joined the Australian Institute of Sport, under the coaching of Dick Telford. In order to improve his limited English he enrolled in a language course at Dickson College. Any money he made in competition he sent back to his family, who remained in Ethiopia.

== Australian running career ==
Mehari twice won the Australian Cross Country Championships, which were held over 12 km, in 1997 and 1998.

Pending citizenship, he was likely to have qualified to represent Australia at the 1998 Commonwealth Games, but instead made the decision to join a group of Kenyan athletes that were competing in Europe. He was said to have been impatient with his rate of improvement and expressed a wish to train with better athletes in order to fulfil his potential.

His personal best for the 5000 metres came in a race in 1998, with a time of 13:20.85. He is the course record holder for the City-Bay race in Adelaide, with a time of 33:42, set in 1998.

In May 1999 he became an Australian citizen and needed an advance on his AIS scholarship money in order to buy a new passport. Due to IAAF rules he had to stand out of competition for three months, so wasn't able to represent his adopted country until August, which was just in time for the 1999 World Championships. He finished 23rd in the final of the 5000 metres.

He was the 5000 metres national champion in 1999.

=== Olympics ===
At the 2000 Summer Olympics, Mehari was eighth in his heat, timed at 13:24.56, fast enough to qualify as the only Australian in the final. He ran the final in 13:42.03 and finished 12th out of the 15 competitors.

== Death ==
Mehari committed suicide at Mount Ainslie on 10 May 2007. Donations were sought to enable his body to be flown back home to his family. His memorial service was held in Queanbeyan on 19 May.
