= Miloud Abaoub =

Algerian middle-distance runner

Miloud Abaoub (born 23 April 1977) is a retired Algerian middle-distance runner.

At the 1998 World Cross Country Championships he finished 26th in the short race. This earned him a fourth place in the team competition with the Algerian team. In the 1500 metres he won the bronze medal in the 1996 World Junior Championships and participated in the 1999 World Championships.

His personal best time was 3:34.37 minutes, achieved in August 1998 in Rieti.
