= Katalin Szentgyörgyi =

Hungarian long-distance runner

Katalin Szentgyörgyi (born 1 January 1979) is a retired Hungarian long-distance runner who specialized in the 5000 metres.

In 1996, she finished in 13th place in the women's 5000 metres at the 1996 World Junior Championships in Athletics held in Sydney, Australia. She won the junior race at the 1998 European Cross Country Championships, and the senior gold medal at the 2000 European Cross Country Championships. She finished fourteenth in the 5000 metres at the 1999 World Championships.

Her personal best times were 4:11.18 minutes in the 1500 metres, achieved in May 1999 in Bucharest; 8:32.70 minutes in the 3000 metres, achieved in July 2001 in Saint-Denis; 15:02.00 minutes in the 5000 metres, achieved in June 2002 in Hengelo; and 32:27.69 minutes in the 10,000 metres, achieved in April 2001 in Barakaldo. The 3000 and 5000 results are Hungarian records.
