= Joan Jepkorir Aiyabei =

Kenyan long-distance runner (born 1979)

Joan Jepkorir Aiyabei (born 17 May 1979 in Uasin Gishu) is a Kenyan long-distance runner.

In 1996, she finished in 5th place in the women's 5000 metres at the 1996 World Junior Championships in Athletics held in Sydney, Australia. She finished sixteenth at the 2002 World Cross Country Championships, but this was not enough to give her a place on the medal-winning team. She finished the season on a high note with a win at the Cross Internacional de Venta de Baños.

At the 2003 World Cross Country Championships she finished twelfth in the long race, while the Kenyan team, of which Aiyabei was a part, won the silver medal in the team competition.

== Personal bests ==
- 3000 metres - 8:54.50 min (2002)
- 5000 metres - 15:18.90 min (2002)
- Half marathon - 1:11:37 hrs (2006)
