= Ayelech Worku =

Ethiopian long-distance runner

Medal record

Women's athletics

Representing Ethiopia

World Championships
| Bronze medal – third place | 1999 Seville | 5000 m |
| Bronze medal – third place | 2001 Edmonton | 5000 m |

All-Africa Games
| Gold medal – first place | 1999 Johannesburg | 5000 m |
| Silver medal – second place | 1995 Harare | 5000 m |

Ayelech Worku (born June 12, 1979) is an Ethiopian long-distance runner, most known for winning two World Championships bronze medals on the 5000 metres. She was born in the Arsi Zone of the Oromia province, the same region as double Olympic champion Haile Gebrselassie.

Worku began competing at a young age: she won the 5000 m silver medal at the 1995 All-Africa Games when she was sixteen years old and won the event at the 1996 World Junior Championships in Athletics. She gained selection for her first Olympics soon after and took part in the 1996 Atlanta Olympics. She finished twelfth in the 5000 m final but she was Ethiopia's best performer in the event. She attended her first World Championships in Athletics shortly after and finished 12th in the 5000 m.

She began to make progress in cross country running, taking the junior bronze at the 1997 IAAF World Cross Country Championships before helping Ethiopia to the team silver at the 1998 edition and then the team gold with a fourth-place finish in the long race at the 1999 IAAF World Cross Country Championships. She finished third in the 1999–2000 IAAF World Cross Challenge. A ninth place at the 2000 World Championships competition brought yet another team gold for Ethiopia.

Individual medals came at track competitions: she recorded a 5000 m personal best to take the bronze medal at the 1999 World Championships in Athletics. Soon after, she scored the gold medal at the 1999 All-Africa Games. Worku made her second Olympic appearance at the 2000 Sydney Games, where she finished in fourth place in the 5000 m behind compatriot Gete Wami. Worku reached the world podium at the next event however by repeating her 5000 m bronze medal feat of two years previous at the 2001 World Championships in Athletics. She finished a close second behind Derartu Tulu in the 10,000 metres at the 2001 Goodwill Games.

Worku began to compete in road running competitions after 2002, winning the 2003 Montferland Run and the 2007 edition of the Hamburg Marathon.

== Personal bests ==
- 1500 metres – 4:10.08 (1999)
- 3000 metres – 8:32.80 (2002)
- 5000 metres – 14:41.23 (2000)
- 10,000 metres – 31:38.08 (2001)
- Marathon – 2:29:14 (2007)

== Achievements ==
| Year | Competition | Venue | Position | Event | Notes |
Representing Ethiopia
| 1995 | All-Africa Games | Harare, Zimbabwe | 2nd | 5,000 metres | 15:48.3 |
| 1996 | Summer Olympics | Atlanta, United States | 12th | 5,000 metres | 15:28.81 |
| 1996 | World Junior Championships | Sydney, Australia | 4th | 3000m | 8:54.24 |
| 1996 | World Junior Championships | Sydney, Australia | 1st | 5000m | 15:40.03 |
| 1997 | World Championships | Athens, Greece | 12th | 5,000 metres | 15:28.07 |
| 1999 | World Championships | Seville, Spain | 3rd | 5,000 metres | 14:44.22 |
| 1999 | All-Africa Games | Johannesburg, South Africa | 1st | 5,000 metres | 15:38.22 |
| 2000 | Summer Olympics | Sydney, Australia | 4th | 5,000 metres | 14:42.67 |
| 2001 | World Championships | Edmonton, Canada | 3rd | 5,000 metres | 15:10.17 |
| 2007 | Hamburg Marathon | Hamburg, Germany | 1st | Marathon | 2:29:14 |
