= Annemari Kiekara =

Finnish long-distance runner

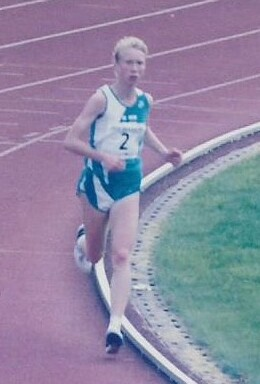
- Annemari Kiekara in 1995

Medal record

Women's athletics

Representing Finland

World Cross Country Championships
Gold medal – first place	1995 Durham	Junior race
Bronze medal – third place	1999 Belfast	Short race

European Cross Country Championships
Gold medal – first place	1995 Alnwick	Individual
Silver medal – second place	1998 Ferrara	Individual
Bronze medal – third place	1996 Charleroi	Individual

Annemari Birgitta Sandell (former Kiekara and formerly Sandell-Hyvärinen; née Sandell; born 2 January 1977 in Kalanti) is a Finnish long-distance runner. Her best achievement in track running is ninth place at the 1995 World Championships in the 10,000 metres.

Nicknamed "Annukka", she competed in 1996 Olympics, finishing 12th in 10000 meters. She is best known as a cross-country runner, in which she won the European Championship in 1995 and finished third on short course at the 1999 World Championships.
