= 1993 IAAF World Cross Country Championships – Junior men's race =

Junior men's race at the 1993 IAAF World Cross Country Championships
- Organisers: IAAF
- Edition: 21st
- Date: March 28
- Host city: Amorebieta, Euskadi, Spain
- Venue: Jaureguibarría Course
- Events: 1
- Distances: 7.15 km – Junior men
- Participation: 150 athletes from 37 nations

The Junior men's race at the 1993 IAAF World Cross Country Championships was held in Amorebieta, Spain, at the Jaureguibarría Course on March 28, 1993. A report on the event was given in The New York Times and in the Herald.

Complete results, medallists, and the results of British athletes were published.

== Race results ==
=== Junior men's race (7.15 km) ===
==== Individual ====
Rank	Athlete	Country	Time
1st place, gold medalist(s)	Philip Mosima	Kenya	20:18
2nd place, silver medalist(s)	Christopher Koskei	Kenya	20:20
3rd place, bronze medalist(s)	Josephat Machuka	Kenya	20:23
4	Lazarus Nyakeraka	Kenya	20:23
5	Tegenu Abebe	Ethiopia	20:28
6	Habte Jifar	Ethiopia	20:50
7	Tibebu Reta	Ethiopia	20:50
8	Stanley Kimutai	Kenya	21:03
9	Geta Tsega	Ethiopia	21:04
10	Tolosa Gebre	Ethiopia	21:05
11	Salah El Ghazi	Morocco	21:08
12	Wener Kashayev	Russia	21:09
13	Kevin Sullivan	Canada	21:19
14	Javier Rodríguez	Spain	21:23
15	Hicham El Guerrouj	Morocco	21:28
16	Anwar O.M. Ali	Yemen	21:28
17	Tekalegne Shewaye	Ethiopia	21:29
18	Abdelmajid El Boubkary	Morocco	21:32
19	Awad Saleh Nasser	Yemen	21:37
20	Viktor Röthlin	Switzerland	21:37
21	José Rios	Spain	21:38
22	Mario Gamito	Portugal	21:38
23	Isaac Radebe	South Africa	21:38
24	Mark McKeown	New Zealand	21:39
25	Aleksey Sobolev	Russia	21:41
26	Enoch Skosana	South Africa	21:41
27	Meck Mothuli	South Africa	21:41
28	Christian Stephenson	United Kingdom	21:42
29	Valeriy Kuzman	Russia	21:42
30	Anwar Al-Harazi	Yemen	21:43
31	Kazuhiro Matsuda	Japan	21:43
32	Driss El Himer	Morocco	21:43
33	Mariano Tarilo	Argentina	21:43
34	Darius Burrows	United Kingdom	21:45
35	Antonio Rebelo	Portugal	21:45
36	Migual Angel Erades	Spain	21:46
37	Sebastiano Mazzara	Italy	21:47
38	Takaomi Kawanami	Japan	21:47
39	Ottaviano Andriani	Italy	21:48
40	Bhupinder Singh Tyagi	India	21:48
41	Mohamed El Hattab	Morocco	21:49
42	Daisuke Arakawa	Japan	21:49
43	José Maria Prieto	Spain	21:50
44	Masaki Yamamoto	Japan	21:52
45	Masayuki Kobayashi	Japan	21:53
46	Arthur Manyake	South Africa	21:53
47	Fabrice Belot	France	21:53
48	Salim Drai	France	21:53
49	Antonio Andriani	Italy	21:54
50	Lubos Pokorny	Czech Republic	21:54
51	Irba Lakhal	Morocco	21:54
52	Tim de Cock	Belgium	21:55
53	Angelo Pacheco	Portugal	21:56
54	Semyon Zhustin	Russia	21:57
55	Daisuke Nakahara	Japan	21:58
56	Joseph Leshonang	South Africa	21:59
57	João Pedro	Portugal	21:59
58	Mário Teixeira	Portugal	22:00
59	Robson Alves	Brazil	22:01
60	Horacio Ferreira	Argentina	22:02
61	Ian Carswell	Canada	22:03
62	Fernando Delgado	Mexico	22:04
63	Mark Steinle	United Kingdom	22:07
64	Reyes Estévez	Spain	22:09
65	Hedi Khalfallah	Tunisia	22:10
66	Mounir Khelil	France	22:10
67	Simone Zanon	Italy	22:11
68	Marcio dos Santos	Brazil	22:12
69	Francois Carpentier	Belgium	22:13
70	Farouk Al-Aswadi	Yemen	22:14
71	Damion Brook-Kintz	United States	22:14
72	Guido Streit	Germany	22:15
73	Garikai Hare	Zimbabwe	22:17
74	Lotfi Belhadj	Tunisia	22:18
75	Heera Singh	India	22:18
76	Marko Kotila	Finland	22:23
77	Khaled Al-Hadaa	Yemen	22:24
78	Killian Lonergan	Ireland	22:24
79	Mohamed Bouguerra	Tunisia	22:24
80	Sean Kaley	Canada	22:25
81	Mike Griffiths	United Kingdom	22:26
82	Phillip Sly	Australia	22:26
83	Giovanni Ruggiero	Italy	22:27
84	Sami Ylihärsilä	Finland	22:27
85	David Salvati	France	22:28
86	Nicolas Leze	France	22:30
87	Rene Carlsen	Denmark	22:30
88	József Babinyecz	Hungary	22:31
89	Gustavo de Paula	Brazil	22:32
90	Faizal Emamaullee	Canada	22:33
91	Zsolt Füleki	Hungary	22:34
92	Ranesh Kumar	India	22:34
93	Ali Harezi Al-Ghazali	Yemen	22:35
94	Robert Lynham	United Kingdom	22:35
95	Pedro Sampaio	Portugal	22:37
96	Christian Belz	Switzerland	22:38
97	Zsolt Bacskai	Hungary	22:38
98	Darren Keenan	Ireland	22:38
99	Jean-Nicolas Duval	Canada	22:39
100	John Castner	United States	22:39
101	Ben Sutton	United Kingdom	22:40
102	Thomas Fuchs	Switzerland	22:41
103	Theodore Martin	United States	22:41
104	Robert Reeder	United States	22:42
105	Alejandro Murro	Argentina	22:43
106	Johannes Schmid	Germany	22:44
107	Zarislav Gapeyenko	Belarus	22:44
108	Jonas Hagelin	Sweden	22:44
109	Paul Engels	Belgium	22:45
110	Joelson Pinheiro	Brazil	22:46
111	Jason Dunklee	United States	22:50
112	Suresh Verma	India	22:50
113	David Healy	Ireland	22:51
114	Martins Alksnis	Latvia	22:52
115	José Delgado	Spain	22:54
116	Mehdi Khelifi	Tunisia	22:57
117	László Nagy	Hungary	22:58
118	Johan de Koning	Netherlands	23:00
119	Eyel Gur	Israel	23:01
120	Declan Fahy	Ireland	23:02
121	Anis Jedidi	Tunisia	23:05
122	Patrick Heinlein	Germany	23:06
123	Pascal Garin	France	23:07
124	Jesper Revsholm	Denmark	23:08
125	Christoph Melcher	Germany	23:10
126	Derek Waters	Ireland	23:11
127	Mohamed Aloui	Tunisia	23:12
128	Christian Isak	Denmark	23:15
129	Paul McNamara	Ireland	23:17
130	Kurt Leyten	Belgium	23:18
131	Rick Obleman	Canada	23:19
132	Jonas Jonsson	Sweden	23:20
133	Oskar Knutsson	Sweden	23:20
134	Søren Helmer	Denmark	23:21
135	Lubomir Masnica	Slovakia	23:23
136	Julián Peralta	Argentina	23:24
137	Christopher Lenz	Germany	23:29
138	Kristian Keller	Denmark	23:30
139	Aigars Fadejevs	Latvia	23:38
140	Giuliano Battocletti	Italy	23:48
141	Patrick Bouten	Netherlands	23:54
142	Martins Jankovskis	Latvia	23:55
143	János Bohus	Hungary	24:02
144	Joseph Tladi	Botswana	24:03
145	Theodore Molla	United States	24:05
146	Alexander Kuhn	Switzerland	24:19
147	Arturs Curkans	Latvia	24:29
148	Philippe Roggo	Switzerland	24:35
149	Martin Johansson	Sweden	24:39
150	Dan Enqvist	Sweden	24:57

==== Teams ====
Rank	Team	Points
1st place, gold medalist(s)	Kenya: Philip Mosima / 1; Christopher Koskei / 2; Josephat Machuka / 3; Lazarus Nyakeraka / 4; (Stanley Kimutai) / (8)	10
2nd place, silver medalist(s)	Ethiopia: Tegenu Abebe / 5; Habte Jifar / 6; Tibebu Reta / 7; Geta Tsega / 9; (Tolosa Gebre) / (10); (Tekalegne Shewaye) / (17)	27
3rd place, bronze medalist(s)	Morocco: Salah El Ghazi / 11; Hicham El Guerrouj / 15; Abdelmajid El Boubkary / 18; Driss El Himer / 32; (Mohamed El Hattab) / (41); (Irba Lakhal) / (51)	76
4	Spain: Javier Rodríguez / 14; José Rios / 21; Migual Angel Erades / 36; José Maria Prieto / 43; (Reyes Estévez) / (64); (José Delgado) / (115)	114
5	Russia: Wener Kashayev / 12; Aleksey Sobolev / 25; Valeriy Kuzman / 29; Semyon Zhustin / 54	120
6	South Africa: Isaac Radebe / 23; Enoch Skosana / 26; Meck Mothuli / 27; Arthur Manyake / 46; (Joseph Leshonang) / (56)	122
7	Yemen: Anwar O.M. Ali / 16; Awad Saleh Nasser / 19; Anwar Al-Harazi / 30; Farouk Al-Aswadi / 70; (Khaled Al-Hadaa) / (77); (Ali Harezi Al-Ghazali) / (93)	135
8	Japan: Kazuhiro Matsuda / 31; Takaomi Kawanami / 38; Daisuke Arakawa / 42; Masaki Yamamoto / 44; (Masayuki Kobayashi) / (45); (Daisuke Nakahara) / (55)	155
9	Portugal: Mario Gamito / 22; Antonio Rebelo / 35; Angelo Pacheco / 53; João Pedro / 57; (Mário Teixeira) / (58); (Pedro Sampaio) / (95)	167
10	Italy: Sebastiano Mazzara / 37; Ottaviano Andriani / 39; Antonio Andriani / 49; Simone Zanon / 67; (Giovanni Ruggiero) / (83); (Giuliano Battocletti) / (140)	192
11	United Kingdom: Christian Stephenson / 28; Darius Burrows / 34; Mark Steinle / 63; Mike Griffiths / 81; (Robert Lynham) / (94); (Ben Sutton) / (101)	206
12	Canada: Kevin Sullivan / 13; Ian Carswell / 61; Sean Kaley / 80; Faizal Emamaullee / 90; (Jean-Nicolas Duval) / (99); (Rick Obleman) / (131)	244
13	France: Fabrice Belot / 47; Salim Drai / 48; Mounir Khelil / 66; David Salvati / 85; (Nicolas Leze) / (86); (Pascal Garin) / (123)	246
14	India: Bhupinder Singh Tyagi / 40; Heera Singh / 75; Ranesh Kumar / 92; Suresh Verma / 112	319
15	Brazil: Robson Alves / 59; Marcio dos Santos / 68; Gustavo de Paula / 89; Joelson Pinheiro / 110	326
16	Tunisia: Hedi Khalfallah / 65; Lotfi Belhadj / 74; Mohamed Bouguerra / 79; Mehdi Khelifi / 116; (Anis Jedidi) / (121); (Mohamed Aloui) / (127)	334
17	Argentina: Mariano Tarilo / 33; Horacio Ferreira / 60; Alejandro Murro / 105; Julián Peralta / 136	334
18	Belgium: Tim de Cock / 52; Francois Carpentier / 69; Paul Engels / 109; Kurt Leyten / 130	360
19	Switzerland: Viktor Röthlin / 20; Christian Belz / 96; Thomas Fuchs / 102; Alexander Kuhn / 146; (Philippe Roggo) / (148)	364
20	United States: Damion Brook-Kintz / 71; John Castner / 100; Theodore Martin / 103; Robert Reeder / 104; (Jason Dunklee) / (111); (Theodore Molla) / (145)	378
21	Hungary: József Babinyecz / 88; Zsolt Füleki / 91; Zsolt Bacskai / 97; László Nagy / 117; (János Bohus) / (143)	393
22	Ireland: Killian Lonergan / 78; Darren Keenan / 98; David Healy / 113; Declan Fahy / 120; (Derek Waters) / (126); (Paul McNamara) / (129)	409
23	Germany: Guido Streit / 72; Johannes Schmid / 106; Patrick Heinlein / 122; Christoph Melcher / 125; (Christopher Lenz) / (137)	425
24	Denmark: Rene Carlsen / 87; Jesper Revsholm / 124; Christian Isak / 128; Søren Helmer / 134; (Kristian Keller) / (138)	473
25	Sweden: Jonas Hagelin / 108; Jonas Jonsson / 132; Oskar Knutsson / 133; Martin Johansson / 149; (Dan Enqvist) / (150)	522
26	Latvia: Martins Alksnis / 114; Aigars Fadejevs / 139; Martins Jankovskis / 142; Arturs Curkans / 147	542

- Note: Athletes in parentheses did not score for the team result

== Participation ==
An unofficial count yields the participation of 150 athletes from 37 countries in the Junior men's race. This is in agreement with the official numbers as published.

- Argentina (4)
- Australia (1)
- Belarus (1)
- Belgium (4)
- Botswana (1)
- Brazil (4)
- Canada (6)
- Czech Republic (1)
- Denmark (5)
- Ethiopia (6)
- Finland (2)
- France (6)
- Germany (5)
- Hungary (5)
- India (4)
- Ireland (6)
- Israel (1)
- Italy (6)
- Japan (6)
- Kenya (5)
- Latvia (4)
- Mexico (1)
- Morocco (6)
- Netherlands (2)
- New Zealand (1)
- Portugal (6)
- Russia (4)
- Slovakia (1)
- South Africa (5)
- Spain (6)
- Sweden (5)
- Switzerland (5)
- Tunisia (6)
- United Kingdom (6)
- United States (6)
- Yemen (6)
- Zimbabwe (1)

== See also ==
- 1993 IAAF World Cross Country Championships – Senior men's race
- 1993 IAAF World Cross Country Championships – Senior women's race
- 1993 IAAF World Cross Country Championships – Junior women's race
