= 1994 IAAF World Cross Country Championships – Junior men's race =

Junior men's race at the 1994 IAAF World Cross Country Championships
- Organisers: IAAF
- Edition: 22nd
- Date: March 26
- Host city: Budapest, Hungary
- Venue: Kincsem Park
- Events: 1
- Distances: 8.14 km – Junior men
- Participation: 189 athletes from 48 nations

The Junior men's race at the 1994 IAAF World Cross Country Championships was held in Budapest, Hungary, at the Kincsem Park on March 26, 1994. A preview on the event was given in the Herald, and a report in The New York Times.

Complete results, medallists, and the results of British athletes were published.

== Race results ==
=== Junior men's race (8.14 km) ===
==== Individual ====
Rank	Athlete	Country	Time
1st place, gold medalist(s)	Philip Mosima	Kenya	24:15
2nd place, silver medalist(s)	Daniel Komen	Kenya	24:17
3rd place, bronze medalist(s)	Abreham Tsige	Ethiopia	24:46
4	Philip Kemei	Kenya	24:49
5	Lemma Alemayehu	Ethiopia	25:00
6	Pablo Olmedo	Mexico	25:04
7	Tibebu Reta	Ethiopia	25:04
8	Reyes Estévez	Spain	25:11
9	Meck Mothuli	South Africa	25:13
10	Salah El Ghazi	Morocco	25:15
11	David Kiptum	Kenya	25:16
12	Tekalegne Shewaye	Ethiopia	25:20
13	Tolosa Gebre	Ethiopia	25:22
14	Benoît Zwierzchiewski	France	25:25
15	Anwar O.M. Ali	Yemen	25:29
16	Miloud Abaoub	Algeria	25:32
17	John Morapedi	South Africa	25:35
18	Abdelmajid El Boubkary	Morocco	25:36
19	John Bungei	Kenya	25:36
20	Mohamed El Hattab	Morocco	25:44
21	Ruslan Deulin	Russia	25:45
22	Fikadu Bekele	Ethiopia	25:46
23	Michitane Noda	Japan	25:47
24	David Galindo	Mexico	25:50
25	Simone Zanon	Italy	25:51
26	Lubos Pokorny	Czech Republic	25:52
27	Darius Burrows	United Kingdom	25:53
28	Alexandru Vasile	Romania	25:53
29	Muneyuki Ojima	Japan	25:54
30	Abdelilah El Marrafe	Morocco	25:55
31	Aaron Gabonewe	South Africa	25:56
32	Kosei Hatcho	Japan	25:59
33	Sergiy Lebid	Ukraine	26:02
34	Hideaki Haraguchi	Japan	26:03
35	Mohamad Ahansal	Morocco	26:03
36	Robson Alves	Brazil	26:04
37	Luciano Di Pardo	Italy	26:08
38	Awad Saleh Nasser	Yemen	26:08
39	Willie Deysel	South Africa	26:08
40	Nicolae Ienciu	Romania	26:09
41	Iván Sánchez	Spain	26:09
42	Pieter van Thournhout	Belgium	26:09
43	David Salvati	France	26:10
44	Zsolt Bacskai	Hungary	26:11
45	José Maria Prieto	Spain	26:14
46	Dariusz Kruczkowski	Poland	26:14
47	Samir Moussaoui	Algeria	26:15
48	Mohamed Amyn	Morocco	26:15
49	Ben Noad	United Kingdom	26:15
50	Greg Jimmerson	United States	26:15
51	Aleksey Rudenko	Russia	26:16
52	Sebastiano Mazzara	Italy	26:17
53	Adam Zukowski	Poland	26:18
54	Kamel Boulahfane	Algeria	26:19
55	Eryk Szostak	Poland	26:20
56	Amrish Kumar	India	26:21
57	Valeriy Kuzman	Russia	26:23
58	Sat Pal	India	26:23
59	Ali Harezi Al-Ghazali	Yemen	26:23
60	Alejandro Cuahtepizi	Mexico	26:24
61	Alessandro Fasulo	Italy	26:24
62	Edson Ramirez	Mexico	26:25
63	Juan Perea	Mexico	26:25
64	Ryo Murakami	Japan	26:26
65	Alberto Álvarez	Spain	26:27
66	Aleksey Potapov	Russia	26:28
67	Chrispen Jera	Zimbabwe	26:28
68	Antonello Landi	Italy	26:29
69	Antonio da Fonseca	Portugal	26:29
70	José Azevedo	Portugal	26:30
71	Iván Pérez	Spain	26:31
72	Clodoaldo da Silva	Brazil	26:31
73	Bryan Schultz	United States	26:32
74	Marius Negrea	Romania	26:33
75	Jerald Pullins	United States	26:35
76	Jeremy Deere	Canada	26:35
77	Gábor Domonyik	Hungary	26:35
78	Nicolas Leze	France	26:36
79	Karel de Waele	Belgium	26:37
80	Eduard Dinu	Romania	26:38
81	Wilson Musto	Kenya	26:38
82	Khaled Al-Hadaa	Yemen	26:39
83	Tomonori Watanabe	Japan	26:40
84	Fabio Biscola	Brazil	26:41
85	Stefan Ghica	Romania	26:41
86	Miroslaw Bieniecki	Poland	26:44
87	Augusto Ramos	Portugal	26:45
88	Abdelghani Amraoui	Algeria	26:46
89	Likhaya Dayile	South Africa	26:47
90	Gergely Benyöcs	Hungary	26:48
91	Marcio dos Santos	Brazil	26:48
92	Zarislav Gapeyenko	Belarus	26:50
93	Neil Caddy	United Kingdom	26:50
94	Slawomir Szydowski	Poland	26:52
95	Marcelo Blanco	Brazil	26:53
96	André Bucher	Switzerland	26:54
97	Stijn Boek	Netherlands	26:55
98	Michael Power	Australia	26:55
99	Armando Ribeiro	Portugal	26:56
100	Mykola Novytskyy	Ukraine	26:56
101	Michael Cox	United States	26:57
102	Suresh Verma	India	26:57
103	Menon Ramsamy	Mauritius	26:58
104	Sean Kaley	Canada	26:59
105	Jussi Virtanen	Finland	27:00
106	Andries Moss	South Africa	27:00
107	Kurt Leyten	Belgium	27:01
108	Angelo Pacheco	Portugal	27:02
109	Ruslan Sukhodolskiy	Moldova	27:03
110	Fecri Idin	Turkey	27:04
111	Mauro Casagrande	Italy	27:04
112	Matt Kerr	Canada	27:05
113	Abdul Rahman Abdullah	Yemen	27:05
114	Roy van Son	Netherlands	27:06
115	Károly Bozan	Hungary	27:08
116	Paul Imhoff	Australia	27:09
117	Abdul Sameer Moos	Mauritius	27:11
118	Scott West	United Kingdom	27:12
119	Ronni Hansen	Denmark	27:12
120	Michal Kaczmarek	Poland	27:13
121	Oleg Chaban	Moldova	27:14
122	Rachid Zerguellan	Algeria	27:14
123	Pavel Klodner	Czech Republic	27:15
124	Radim Vetchy	Czech Republic	27:15
125	Maros Foltany	Slovakia	27:16
126	Patrick Joyce	United States	27:17
127	Bolko von Unruh	Germany	27:18
128	Murray Link	Canada	27:19
129	Matt O'Dowd	United Kingdom	27:19
130	Ivan Noms	Argentina	27:21
131	Steven Fein	United States	27:25
132	Thomas Gonfroy	France	27:28
133	Rod Woestenborghs	Belgium	27:29
134	Dalibor Balgac	Croatia	27:30
135	Kevin Holland	United Kingdom	27:31
136	Laurent Guillemin	France	27:32
137	Torsten Grube	Germany	27:32
138	Vikram Singh	India	27:33
139	Dario Nuñez	Argentina	27:33
140	Carsten Schütz	Germany	27:35
141	David Quayle	Australia	27:35
142	Nikolay Zaharov	Ukraine	27:36
143	Aleksei Malyukovich	Belarus	27:37
144	Jeroen van Dijke	Netherlands	27:41
145	Antonio Gómez	Spain	27:41
146	Aleksandr Sevrov	Belarus	27:42
147	Viktor Golubev	Belarus	27:42
148	Fülöp Szabó	Hungary	27:43
149	Rune Funder	Denmark	27:43
150	Azzedine Zerdoum	Algeria	27:44
151	Arnoud Seldentuis	Netherlands	27:46
152	Jean Pierre Ndahimana	Rwanda	27:49
153	Julián Peralta	Argentina	27:52
154	Menisan Sanbato	Israel	27:53
155	Mikhail Yeginov	Kazakhstan	27:54
156	Romon Ivasiv	Ukraine	27:55
157	Marian Popescu	Romania	27:56
158	Martin Brusak	Czech Republic	27:59
159	Jerome Cochet	France	28:01
160	Yuriy Tikhonov	Russia	28:04
161	Marco Kallmeier	Germany	28:04
162	Ralf Courage	Netherlands	28:04
163	Brian Jensen	Denmark	28:05
164	Borko Antonic	Yugoslavia	28:06
165	Bayan Batyrbekov	Kyrgyzstan	28:12
166	Mikkel Bjergsø	Denmark	28:19
167	Rastislav Najdek	Slovakia	28:22
168	Jonathan Bourqe	Canada	28:23
169	Aleksey Shestakov	Kazakhstan	28:24
170	Richard Laursen	Denmark	28:28
171	László Nagy	Hungary	28:30
172	Chris Beechey	Australia	28:33
173	Abdylesis Nurliev	Turkmenistan	28:36
174	Aaron Mullins	Australia	28:38
175	Jean Paul Louise	Mauritius	28:47
176	Anada Murden	Mauritius	28:53
177	Oleg Babyak	Kazakhstan	28:54
178	Robert Grojzdek	Slovenia	28:55
179	Andrey Pilipenko	Turkmenistan	28:58
180	Jeppe Bjergsø	Denmark	29:15
181	Frank Brucksch	Germany	29:25
182	Denis Simicic	Croatia	29:28
183	Amadou Camara	Sierra Leone	29:49
184	Kemal Tuvakuliyev	Turkmenistan	29:52
185	Laori Tiganik	Estonia	30:21
186	Marcelo Zabala	Argentina	30:23
—	Kaido Koppel	Estonia	DNF
—	Aleksey Gavrilov	Kazakhstan	DNF
—	Husam Al-Hajjar	Palestine	DNF

==== Teams ====
Rank	Team	Points
1st place, gold medalist(s)	Kenya: Philip Mosima / 1; Daniel Komen / 2; Philip Kemei / 4; David Kiptum / 11; (John Bungei) / (19); (Wilson Musto) / (81)	18
2nd place, silver medalist(s)	Ethiopia: Abreham Tsige / 3; Lemma Alemayehu / 5; Tibebu Reta / 7; Tekalegne Shewaye / 12; (Tolosa Gebre) / (13); (Fikadu Bekele) / (22)	27
3rd place, bronze medalist(s)	Morocco: Salah El Ghazi / 10; Abdelmajid El Boubkary / 18; Mohamed El Hattab / 20; Abdelilah El Marrafe / 30; (Mohamad Ahansal) / (35); (Mohamed Amyn) / (48)	78
4	South Africa: Meck Mothuli / 9; John Morapedi / 17; Aaron Gabonewe / 31; Willie Deysel / 39; (Likhaya Dayile) / (89); (Andries Moss) / (106)	96
5	Japan: Michitane Noda / 23; Muneyuki Ojima / 29; Kosei Hatcho / 32; Hideaki Haraguchi / 34; (Ryo Murakami) / (64); (Tomonori Watanabe) / (83)	118
6	Mexico: Pablo Olmedo / 6; David Galindo / 24; Alejandro Cuahtepizi / 60; Edson Ramirez / 62; (Juan Perea) / (63)	152
7	Spain: Reyes Estévez / 8; Iván Sánchez / 41; José Maria Prieto / 45; Alberto Álvarez / 65; (Iván Pérez) / (71); (Antonio Gómez) / (145)	159
8	Italy: Simone Zanon / 25; Luciano Di Pardo / 37; Sebastiano Mazzara / 52; Alessandro Fasulo / 61; (Antonello Landi) / (68); (Mauro Casagrande) / (111)	175
9	Yemen: Anwar O.M. Ali / 15; Awad Saleh Nasser / 38; Ali Harezi Al-Ghazali / 59; Khaled Al-Hadaa / 82; (Abdul Rahman Abdullah) / (113)	194
10	Russia: Ruslan Deulin / 21; Aleksey Rudenko / 51; Valeriy Kuzman / 57; Aleksey Potapov / 66; (Yuriy Tikhonov) / (160)	195
11	Algeria: Miloud Abaoub / 16; Samir Moussaoui / 47; Kamel Boulahfane / 54; Abdelghani Amraoui / 88; (Rachid Zerguellan) / (122); (Azzedine Zerdoum) / (150)	205
12	Romania: Alexandru Vasile / 28; Nicolae Ienciu / 40; Marius Negrea / 74; Eduard Dinu / 80; (Stefan Ghica) / (85); (Marian Popescu) / (157)	222
13	Poland: Dariusz Kruczkowski / 46; Adam Zukowski / 53; Eryk Szostak / 55; Miroslaw Bieniecki / 86; (Slawomir Szydowski) / (94); (Michal Kaczmarek) / (120)	240
14	France: Benoît Zwierzchiewski / 14; David Salvati / 43; Nicolas Leze / 78; Thomas Gonfroy / 132; (Laurent Guillemin) / (136); (Jerome Cochet) / (159)	267
15	Brazil: Robson Alves / 36; Clodoaldo da Silva / 72; Fabio Biscola / 84; Marcio dos Santos / 91; (Marcelo Blanco) / (95)	283
16	United Kingdom: Darius Burrows / 27; Ben Noad / 49; Neil Caddy / 93; Scott West / 118; (Matt O'Dowd) / (129); (Kevin Holland) / (135)	287
17	United States: Greg Jimmerson / 50; Bryan Schultz / 73; Jerald Pullins / 75; Michael Cox / 101; (Patrick Joyce) / (126); (Steven Fein) / (131)	299
18	Portugal: Antonio da Fonseca / 69; José Azevedo / 70; Augusto Ramos / 87; Armando Ribeiro / 99; (Angelo Pacheco) / (108)	325
19	Hungary: Zsolt Bacskai / 44; Gábor Domonyik / 77; Gergely Benyöcs / 90; Károly Bozan / 115; (Fülöp Szabó) / (148); (László Nagy) / (171)	326
20	India: Amrish Kumar / 56; Sat Pal / 58; Suresh Verma / 102; Vikram Singh / 138	354
21	Belgium: Pieter van Thournhout / 42; Karel de Waele / 79; Kurt Leyten / 107; Rod Woestenborghs / 133	361
22	Canada: Jeremy Deere / 76; Sean Kaley / 104; Matt Kerr / 112; Murray Link / 128; (Jonathan Bourqe) / (168)	420
23	Ukraine: Sergiy Lebid / 33; Mykola Novytskyy / 100; Nikolay Zaharov / 142; Romon Ivasiv / 156	431
24	Czech Republic: Lubos Pokorny / 26; Pavel Klodner / 123; Radim Vetchy / 124; Martin Brusak / 158	431
25	Netherlands: Stijn Boek / 97; Roy van Son / 114; Jeroen van Dijke / 144; Arnoud Seldentuis / 151; (Ralf Courage) / (162)	506
26	Australia: Michael Power / 98; Paul Imhoff / 116; David Quayle / 141; Chris Beechey / 172; (Aaron Mullins) / (174)	527
27	Belarus: Zarislav Gapeyenko / 92; Aleksei Malyukovich / 143; Aleksandr Sevrov / 146; Viktor Golubev / 147	528
28	Germany: Bolko von Unruh / 127; Torsten Grube / 137; Carsten Schütz / 140; Marco Kallmeier / 161; (Frank Brucksch) / (181)	565
29	Mauritius: Menon Ramsamy / 103; Abdul Sameer Moos / 117; Jean Paul Louise / 175; Anada Murden / 176	571
30	Denmark: Ronni Hansen / 119; Rune Funder / 149; Brian Jensen / 163; Mikkel Bjergsø / 166; (Richard Laursen) / (170); (Jeppe Bjergsø) / (180)	597
31	Argentina: Ivan Noms / 130; Dario Nuñez / 139; Julián Peralta / 153; Marcelo Zabala / 186	608
DNF	Kazakhstan: Mikhail Yeginov / (155); Aleksey Shestakov / (169); Oleg Babyak / (177); Aleksey Gavrilov / (DNF)	DNF

- Note: Athletes in parentheses did not score for the team result

== Participation ==
An unofficial count yields the participation of 189 athletes from 48 countries in the Junior men's race. This is in agreement with the official numbers as published.

- Algeria (6)
- Argentina (4)
- Australia (5)
- Belarus (4)
- Belgium (4)
- Brazil (5)
- Canada (5)
- Croatia (2)
- Czech Republic (4)
- Denmark (6)
- Estonia (2)
- Ethiopia (6)
- Finland (1)
- France (6)
- Germany (5)
- Hungary (6)
- India (4)
- Israel (1)
- Italy (6)
- Japan (6)
- Kazakhstan (4)
- Kenya (6)
- Kyrgyzstan (1)
- Mauritius (4)
- Mexico (5)
- Moldova (2)
- Morocco (6)
- Netherlands (5)
- Palestine (1)
- Poland (6)
- Portugal (5)
- Romania (6)
- Russia (5)
- Rwanda (1)
- Sierra Leone (1)
- Slovakia (2)
- Slovenia (1)
- South Africa (6)
- Spain (6)
- Switzerland (1)
- Turkey (1)
- Turkmenistan (3)
- Ukraine (4)
- United Kingdom (6)
- United States (6)
- Yemen (5)
- Yugoslavia (1)
- Zimbabwe (1)

== See also ==
- 1994 IAAF World Cross Country Championships – Senior men's race
- 1994 IAAF World Cross Country Championships – Senior women's race
- 1994 IAAF World Cross Country Championships – Junior women's race
