= 1999 World Championships in Athletics – Men's 10,000 metres =

The men's 10,000 metres event featured at the 1999 World Championships in Seville, Spain. The final was held on 24 August 1999.

== Final ranking ==
RANK	ATHLETE	TIME
	Haile Gebrselassie (ETH)	27:57.27
	Paul Tergat (KEN)	27:58.56
	Assefa Mezgebu (ETH)	27:59.15
4.	Girma Tolla (ETH)	28:02.08
5.	António Pinto (POR)	28:03.42
6.	Habte Jifar (ETH)	28:08.82
7.	Benjamin Maiyo (KEN)	28:14.98
8.	Kamiel Maase (NED)	28:15.58
9.	David Chelule (KEN)	28:17.77
10.	Khalid Skah (MAR)	28:25.10
11.	Hendrick Ramaala (RSA)	28:25.57
12.	Toshinari Takaoka (JPN)	28:30.73
13.	João N'Tyamba (ANG)	28:31.09
14.	Enrique Molina (ESP)	28:37.19
15.	Ismaïl Sghyr (MAR)	28:41.49
16.	Saïd Berioui (MAR)	28:46.77
17.	Mohamed Ezzher (FRA)	28:47.01
18.	Kenji Takao (JPN)	28:49.95
19.	José Manuel Martínez (ESP)	28:55.87
20.	Satoshi Irifune (JPN)	29:04.09
21.	Brad Hauser (USA)	29:18.21
22.	Pete Julian (USA)	29:20.31
23.	Enoch Skosana (RSA)	29:30.51
24.	Alejandro Salvador (MEX)	29:36.58
25.	Bruno Toledo (ESP)	29:39.28
26.	Sean Kaley (CAN)	29:52.35
27.	Samir Moussaoui (ALG)	30:20.24
	Shadrack Hoff (RSA)	DNF
	Alan Culpepper (USA)	DNF
	Jon Brown (GBR)	DNF
	Ali Mabruk El-Zaidi (LBA)	DNF
	Mohamed Al-Khawlani (YEM)	DNF
