= 1996 World Junior Championships in Athletics – Men's 5000 metres =

The men's 5000 metres event at the 1996 World Junior Championships in Athletics was held in Sydney, Australia, at International Athletic Centre on 23 and 25 August.

== Medalists ==
Gold	Assefa Mezegebu; Ethiopia
Silver	David Chelule; Kenya
Bronze	Aaron Gabonewe; South Africa

== Results ==
=== Final ===
25 August

Rank	Name	Nationality	Time	Notes
1st place, gold medalist(s)	Assefa Mezegebu	Ethiopia	13:35.30	
2nd place, silver medalist(s)	David Chelule	Kenya	13:36.27	
3rd place, bronze medalist(s)	Aaron Gabonewe	South Africa	13:46.19	
4	Tetsuhiro Furuta	Japan	13:46.59	
5	Marko Hhawu	Tanzania	13:52.51	
6	Godfrey Nyombi	Uganda	13:55.92	
7	Yuki Yamamoto	Japan	14:06.59	
8	John Gilay	Tanzania	14:07.93	
9	Adrian Maghiar	Romania	14:08.35	
10	Janko Benša	Yugoslavia	14:12.13	
11	Stephen Njenga	Kenya	14:24.18	
12	Sebastian Hallmann	Germany	14:50.14	
	Gojen Singh	India	DNS	
	David Galindo	Mexico	DNS	
	Sisay Bezabeh	Ethiopia	DNS	

=== Heats ===
23 August

==== Heat 1 ====
Rank	Name	Nationality	Time	Notes
1	Assefa Mezegebu	Ethiopia	14:07.15	Q
2	Aaron Gabonewe	South Africa	14:07.22	Q
3	Stephen Njenga	Kenya	14:07.27	Q
4	Marko Hhawu	Tanzania	14:07.66	Q
5	Yuki Yamamoto	Japan	14:13.20	Q
6	John Gilay	Tanzania	14:13.45	q
7	Gojen Singh	India	14:14.48	q
8	Mark Thompson	Australia	14:21.97	
9	Samuel Mangusho	Uganda	14:22.37	
10	Francisco Mondragón	Mexico	14:25.34	
11	Marilson dos Santos	Brazil	14:30.99	
12	Oscar Meza	Paraguay	15:39.16	
13	José Castillo Cáceres	Honduras	15:43.01	
	Frank Hoffmeister	Germany	DNF	

==== Heat 2 ====
Rank	Name	Nationality	Time	Notes
1	Sisay Bezabeh	Ethiopia	14:05.00	Q
2	David Chelule	Kenya	14:05.80	Q
3	Tetsuhiro Furuta	Japan	14:06.16	Q
4	David Galindo	Mexico	14:06.57	Q
5	Janko Benša	Yugoslavia	14:08.34	Q
6	Sebastian Hallmann	Germany	14:09.52	q
7	Adrian Maghiar	Romania	14:09.65	q
8	Godfrey Nyombi	Uganda	14:09.77	q
9	Ricardo Maestrelo	Brazil	14:16.08	
10	Brent Hauser	United States	14:17.21	
11	Fecri Idin	Turkey	14:53.60	
12	Sinlasone Sanith	Laos	15:25.46	
13	Mohamed Ould Abdellahy	Mauritania	16:12.57	

== Participation ==
According to an unofficial count, 27 athletes from 19 countries participated in the event.

- Australia (1)
- Brazil (2)
- Ethiopia (2)
- Germany (2)
- Honduras (1)
- India (1)
- Japan (2)
- Kenya (2)
- Laos (1)
- Mauritania (1)
- Mexico (2)
- Paraguay (1)
- Romania (1)
- South Africa (1)
- Tanzania (2)
- Turkey (1)
- Uganda (2)
- United States (1)
- Yugoslavia (1)
