= 1996 World Junior Championships in Athletics – Men's 10,000 metres =

The men's 10,000 metres event at the 1996 World Junior Championships in Athletics was held in Sydney, Australia, at International Athletic Centre on 21 August 1996. In the race, there was a mistake in the lap counting of the judges, that caused many athletes to run 24 laps (9600 m) only.

== Medalists ==
Gold	Assefa Mezegebu; Ethiopia
Silver	David Chelule; Kenya
Bronze	Tetsuhiro Furuta; Japan

== Results ==
=== Final ===
21 August

Rank	Name	Nationality	Time	Notes
1st place, gold medalist(s)	Assefa Mezegebu	Ethiopia	28:27.78	
2nd place, silver medalist(s)	David Chelule	Kenya	28:29.14	
3rd place, bronze medalist(s)	Tetsuhiro Furuta	Japan	28:31.61	
4	David Galindo	Mexico	28:34.66	
5	Marko Hhawu	Tanzania	28:35.02	
6	David Ngetich	Kenya	28:39.79	
7	Naoki Mishiro	Japan	28:50.21	
8	Sisay Bezabeh	Ethiopia	28:55.97	
9	Francisco Mondragón	Mexico	28:57.61	
10	Samuel Mangusho	Uganda	29:21.25	
11	Godfrey Nyombi	Uganda	29:21.43	
12	John Gilay	Tanzania	29:29.10	
13	Gojen Singh	India	29:32.68	
14	Brad Hauser	United States	29:32.88	
15	David Posada	Spain	29:35.31	
16	Mukat Derbe	Israel	29:35.57	
17	Aleksandr Gelesh	Ukraine	29:39.66	
18	Paulo Lunkes	Brazil	29:49.39	
19	Janko Benša	Yugoslavia	29:53.41	
20	Kang Yanwei	China	30:18.34	
21	Martin Beckmann	Germany	30:23.10	
22	Joseph Nsengiyumya	Rwanda	30:34.24	
23	Maximilian Bahn	Germany	30:38.68	
24	Peter Gilmore	United States	31:09.64	
25	Sinlasone Sanith	Laos	31:52.66	
26	Mohamed Ould Abdellahy	Mauritania	33:21.72	
27	Win Zaw Oo	Myanmar	34:25.75	
	Ricardo Maestrelo	Brazil	DNF	
	Dmitriy Maksimov	Russia	DNF	

== Participation ==
According to an unofficial count, 29 athletes from 20 countries participated in the event.

- Brazil (2)
- China (1)
- Ethiopia (2)
- Germany (2)
- India (1)
- Israel (1)
- Japan (2)
- Kenya (2)
- Laos (1)
- Mauritania (1)
- Mexico (2)
- Myanmar (1)
- Russia (1)
- Rwanda (1)
- Spain (1)
- Tanzania (2)
- Uganda (2)
- Ukraine (1)
- United States (2)
- Yugoslavia (1)
