= 1997 World Championships in Athletics – Men's 10,000 metres =

The men's 10,000 metres event featured at the 1997 World Championships in Athens, Greece. There were a total number of 33 participating athletes, with two qualifying heats and the final being held on 6 August 1997.

The question was, how to beat the Olympic Champion and new World Record holder Haile Gebrselassie. The pack, led by Kenyans Paul Koech and Dominic Kirui jogged around the track for almost 15 laps with a few constants; Gebrselassie was marking the leader from second or third place, and everybody else was jockeying for position to be near him. With ten laps to go, previous world record holder Salah Hissou made a more serious move to the front, the pace quickened by four seconds a lap and all the contenders reacted. Hissou only held the lead for a lap before dropping back but the faster trend continued and the pack dwindled to six. Even Kirui dropped off the back, but Koech continued to lead with his teammate Paul Tergat focused on Gebrselassie's back. The pace gradually slowed slightly, while Hissou and Domingos Castro took their turns behind Gebrselassie as the laps diminished. With two laps to go, Hissou and Castro boxed Gebrselassie and moved around him, that lasted for about 100 metres before Gebrselassie simply ran around them assuming a defensive position on Koech's outside shoulder. 550 metres before the finish, Gebrselassie took off, opening up a 10-metre gap before he reached the straightaway. For Gebrselassie, it was an easy last lap, almost a victory lap while still in competition. Tergat and behind him Hissou launched into their best last lap kicks, but it was far too little and too late to catch Gebrselassie. Tergat separated from Hissou for silver.

== Final ==
RANK	FINAL	TIME
	Haile Gebrselassie (ETH)	27:24.58
	Paul Tergat (KEN)	27:25.62
	Salah Hissou (MAR)	27:28.67
4.	Paul Koech (KEN)	27:30.39
5.	Assefa Mezgebu (ETH)	27:32.48
6.	Domingos Castro (POR)	27:36.52
7.	Habte Jifar (ETH)	28:00.29
8.	Julio Rey (ESP)	28:07.06
9.	Stefano Baldini (ITA)	28:11.97
10.	Darren Wilson (AUS)	28:20.16
11.	Kamiel Maase (NED)	28:23.30
12.	Dominic Kirui (KEN)	28:28.13
13.	Abderrahim Zitouna (MAR)	28:29.09
14.	Hendrick Ramaala (RSA)	28:33.48
15.	Tendai Chimusasa (ZIM)	28:55.29
16.	Carsten Eich (GER)	28:59.34
17.	Said Berioui (MAR)	29:22.05
18.	José Ramos (POR)	29:49.00
—	Toshinari Takaoka (JPN)	DNS
—	Mohammed Mourhit (BEL)	DNS

== Qualifying heats ==
- Held on Sunday 1997-08-03

RANK	HEAT 1	TIME
1.	Domingos Castro (POR)	28:07.04
2.	Mohammed Mourhit (BEL)	28:12.02
3.	Said Berioui (MAR)	28:12.33
4.	Carsten Eich (GER)	28:12.46
5.	Paul Koech (KEN)	28:13.24
6.	Assefa Mezgebu (ETH)	28:13.95
7.	Paul Tergat (KEN)	28:13.98
8.	Salah Hissou (MAR)	28:15.09
9.	José Ramos (POR)	28:20.06
10.	Carlos de la Torre (ESP)	28:20.50
11.	Toshiyuki Hayata (JPN)	28:27.97
12.	Dan Middleman (USA)	28:56.76
13.	Marco Condori (BOL)	29:51.24
14.	Agustin Moran (PAN)	30:12.32

RANK	HEAT 2	TIME
1.	Haile Gebrselassie (ETH)	27:55.36
2.	Habte Jifar (ETH)	27:55.71
3.	Dominic Kirui (KEN)	27:56.62
4.	Abderrahim Zitouna (MAR)	27:57.11
5.	Darren Wilson (AUS)	27:57.54
6.	Kamiel Maase (NED)	27:57.78
7.	Julio Rey (ESP)	28:03.36
8.	Hendrick Ramaala (RSA)	28:05.70
9.	Toshinari Takaoka (JPN)	28:07.36
10.	Stefano Baldini (ITA)	28:07.81
11.	Tendai Chimusasa (ZIM)	28:14.03
12.	Mohamed Ezzher (FRA)	28:47.48
13.	João N'Tyamba (ANG)	29:38.92
14.	Brad Barquist (USA)	29:43.01
15.	Margarito Zamora (MEX)	29:52.03
16.	Panagiotis Charamis (GRE)	30:08.60
17.	Georges Richmond (TAH)	31:48.17
—	Carlos Patrício (POR)	DNF
—	Zoltán Káldy (HUN)	DNF

== See also ==
- 1996 Men's Olympic 10.000 metres
