= Kenji Takao =

Japanese long-distance runner (born 1975)

Medal record

Men's athletics

Representing Japan

Asian Games
Gold medal – first place	1998 Bangkok	10,000 m

East Asian Games
Silver medal – second place	1997 Busan	10,000 m

Kenji Takao (Japanese: 高尾 憲司; born 23 March 1975) is a Japanese running coach and former long-distance runner who competed mainly in the 10,000 metres. His personal best for the distance was 27:56.05 minutes, set in 1995. He was the 1998 Asian Games champion in the 10,000 m.

Takao twice represented Japan at the World Championships in Athletics, running in 1995 and 1999. Other than his Asian Games title, he won two other international 10,000 m medals during his career: a silver at the 1994 World Junior Championships in Athletics and a second silver at the 1997 East Asian Games.

He competed up to the marathon distance in the latter half of his career but retired in 2005 due to injury. He launched his own running club in 2006 (Running Club Blooming) and has since gone into coaching.

== Career ==
=== Early life ===
Born in Kyōtanabe, Takao attended Kyotanabe Municipal Tanabe junior high school then went on to graduate from Uji High School in 1993. That same year, he set a Japanese high school best of 47:46 minutes at the Himeji Castle 10-Miler and joined the Asahi Kasei corporate running team. While at high school he competed at the All-Japan High School Ekiden Championship. He passed the entrance exam to attend Kanto Gakuin University, but instead decided to run professionally.

Focusing on running full-time, he quickly proved himself among Japan's best athletics prospects by setting national junior records of 13:35.2 minutes for the 5000 metres at the Noboeka Golden Games and of 28:20.78 minutes for the 10,000 metres at the Hyogo Relay Carnival. His international debut followed at the 1994 World Junior Championships in Athletics, where he entered both long-distance track events. A time of 28:55.24 minutes brought him the silver medal behind Daniel Komen (who broke world records only two years later). In the 5000 m he did not reach the podium but still managed 5000 m. He also performed well on the roads, winning at the Karatsu 10-Miler.

=== Senior debut ===
Takao was a winner at the All-Japan Corporate Ekiden Championships in 1995 with Asahi Kasei – a title he would go on to win three times more with the team during his career. He began to make an impact in the senior ranks that year, starting with a fourth-place finish at the Japan Championships in Athletics over 10,000 m, dipping under the 28-minute barrier for the first time. This brought him selection for the event at the 1995 World Championships in Athletics alongside Toshiyuki Hayata and Yasuyuki Watanabe. Making his senior international debut, he failed to make it beyond the heats stage.

At the start of the 1996 season he made his debut over the half marathon distance in Tokyo, recording a time of 62:08 minutes but finishing out of the top ten in the high calibre race. He did not compete much on the track, but returned to major competition the following year with a silver medal-winning performance in the 10,000 m at the 1997 East Asian Games, finishing second to reigning Asian Games champion Toshinari Takaoka. He was runner-up at the national championships and also the Kumamoto Kosa 10-Miler (setting a lifetime best of 46:02 minutes at the latter). He did not compete at the 1997 World Championships in Athletics, with Takaoka and Hayata representing Japan instead.

=== Asian Games title ===
The 1998 track season proved to be a breakthrough for Takao. In May he set a 5000 m best of 13:34.55 minutes during a win at the Noboeka Golden Games. He was victorious over 10,000 m at the Japanese Championships, taking the first and only national title of his career. He followed that performance with another gold medal – running at the 1998 Asian Games in Bangkok he took the gold medal in the 10,000 m by narrowing beating Qatar's Ahmed Ibrahim Warsama in a tactical race. He also ran a career best of 3:46.17 minutes for the 1500 metres to take third place at the Japanese National Games. For his achievements that year he was awarded the Education, Culture, Sports, Science Minister's Prize.

Takao's debut over the marathon distance came at the start of 1999. Entering the Beppu-Ōita Marathon, he kept up with the leaders for much of the race but after suffering a fall on the course he ended up in sixth place with a time of 2:11:31 hours. Returning to the track he ran a time of 27:56.77 minutes at the Noboeka 10,000 m – a time which ranked him third among Asian men that year. He was chosen for Japan at the 1999 World Championships in Athletics and gave the highest finish of his international career by ending the race in 18th place.

=== Injury and coaching ===
He did not compete in 2000, having injured his Achilles tendon of his right foot. He struggled to regain form over the next two years. In 2003 he was back in shape enough to win at the Oita City 20K and also the Osaka Half Marathon. He also recorded a time of 28:17.91 minutes for the 10,000 m at the Hyogo Relays. This was to be his last major performance at the track distance however. The injury recurred and he underwent surgery in 2004, missing the whole season. He retired from his corporate running team in 2005 and in January 2006 founded his own running club for amateur and high school athletes – "Running Club Blooming".

Though still competing as long-distance runner in public races, from 2006 onwards his main focus became coaching. He gained a degree in sports science from the Osaka Sangyo University (studying from 2008 to 2012). Following this he began post-graduate study at Ritsumeikan University and Osaka Prefecture University, while serving as university track coach at the former institution.

== International competitions ==
Year	Competition	Venue	Position	Event	Notes
Representing Japan
1994	World Junior Championships	Lisbon, Portugal	5th	5000 m	14:02.55
1994	World Junior Championships	Lisbon, Portugal	2nd	10,000 m	28:55.24
1995	World Championships	Gothenburg, Sweden	14th (heats)	10,000 metres	28:47.01
1997	East Asian Games	Busan, South Korea	2nd	10,000 metres	29:29.08
1998	Asian Games	Bangkok, Thailand	1st	10,000 metres	28:45.66
1999	World Championships	Seville, Spain	18th	10,000 metres	28:49.95

== Personal bests ==
- 1500 metres – 3:46.17 min (1998)
- 3000 metres – 8:03.1 min (1997)
- 5000 metres – 13:34.55 min (1998)
- 10,000 metres – 27:56.05 min (1995)
- 10 miles – 46:02 min (1997)
- Half marathon – 62:08 min (1996)
- Marathon – 2:11:31 min (1999)
