= 1994 World Junior Championships in Athletics – Men's 10,000 metres =

The men's 10,000 metres event at the 1994 World Junior Championships in Athletics was held in Lisbon, Portugal, at Estádio Universitário de Lisboa on 20 July.

== Medalists ==
| Gold | Daniel Komen; Kenya |
| Silver | Kenji Takao; Japan |
| Bronze | Michitane Noda; Japan |

== Results ==
=== Final ===
20 July

| Rank | Name | Nationality | Time | Notes |
|---|---|---|---|---|
| 1st place, gold medalist(s) | Daniel Komen | Kenya | 28:29.74 | |
| 2nd place, silver medalist(s) | Kenji Takao | Japan | 28:55.24 | |
| 3rd place, bronze medalist(s) | Michitane Noda | Japan | 29:00.55 | |
| 4 | Habte Jifar | Ethiopia | 29:04.57 | |
| 5 | Tekalegne Shewaye | Ethiopia | 29:06.03 | |
| 6 | Ko Jung-Won | South Korea | 29:17.23 | |
| 7 | Simone Zanon | Italy | 29:21.00 | |
| 8 | Iván Pérez | Spain | 29:36.15 | |
| 9 | Carlos García | Spain | 29:40.41 | |
| 10 | Blair Martin | New Zealand | 29:41.74 | |
| 11 | Ruslan Deulin | Russia | 29:53.85 | |
| 12 | Fernando García | Mexico | 30:03.40 | |
| 13 | Clodoaldo da Silva | Brazil | 30:13.21 | |
| 14 | Hassan Ali Al-Asmari | Saudi Arabia | 30:14.32 | |
| 15 | Ruslan Sukhodolskiy | Moldova | 30:31.49 | |
| 16 | Matthew Brill | United States | 30:38.71 | |
| 17 | Dilaver Kanber | Turkey | 30:39.45 | |
| 18 | Pedro Monteiro | Portugal | 30:45.18 | |
| 19 | Youssouf Diallo | Mali | 30:47.98 | |
| 20 | Fabio Biscola | Brazil | 30:52.07 | |
| 21 | Zsolt Bácskai | Hungary | 30:57.10 | |
| 22 | Néstor García | Uruguay | 31:00.53 | |
| 23 | Edson Ramírez | Mexico | 31:06.92 | |
| 24 | Abdul Rahman Abdullah | Yemen | 31:12.63 | |
| 25 | Martins Alksnis | Latvia | 31:16.95 | |
| 26 | Aleksandr Chernenko | Moldova | 31:27.58 | |
| 27 | Ivan Noms | Argentina | 31:29.48 | |
| 28 | Michael Aish | New Zealand | 31:36.22 | |
| 29 | Greg Jimmerson | United States | 31:47.32 | |
| 30 | Menisan Sanbato | Israel | 31:59.79 | |
| 31 | Dario Nuñez | Argentina | 32:04.70 | |
| 32 | Sebastiano Mazzara | Italy | 32:57.25 | |
| 33 | Fidele Dovenon | Benin | 33:28.29 | |
| | António da Fonseca | Portugal | DNF | |

== Participation ==
According to an unofficial count, 34 athletes from 23 countries participated in the event.

- Argentina (2)
- Benin (1)
- Brazil (2)
- Ethiopia (2)
- Hungary (1)
- Israel (1)
- Italy (2)
- Japan (2)
- Kenya (1)
- Latvia (1)
- Mali (1)
- Mexico (2)
- Moldova (2)
- New Zealand (2)
- Portugal (2)
- Russia (1)
- Saudi Arabia (1)
- South Korea (1)
- Spain (2)
- Turkey (1)
- United States (2)
- Uruguay (1)
- Yemen (1)
