= Athletics at the 1998 Commonwealth Games – Men's 5000 metres =

Men's 5000 metres at the Commonwealth Games

The men's 5000 metres event at the 1998 Commonwealth Games was held 18–19 September on National Stadium, Bukit Jalil.

== Medalists ==
Gold	Silver	Bronze
Daniel Komen; Kenya	Tom Nyariki; Kenya	Richard Limo; Kenya

== Results ==
=== Heats ===
Qualification: First 5 of each heat (Q) and the next 5 fastest (q) qualified for the semifinals.

Rank	Heat	Name	Nationality	Time	Notes
1	2	Richard Limo	Kenya	14:00.16	Q
2	2	Jason Bunston	Canada	14:03.44	Q
3	2	Lee Troop	Australia	14:09.68	Q
4	2	Shadrack Hoff	South Africa	14:10.24	Q
5	2	Godfrey Nyombi	Uganda	14:10.43	Q
6	2	Kristen Bowditch	England	14:11.51	q
7	2	John Morapedi	South Africa	14:15.30	q
8	2	Karl Keska	England	14:17.23	q
9	1	Tom Nyariki	Kenya	14:21.71	Q
10	1	Daniel Komen	Kenya	14:22.12	Q
11	1	Keith Cullen	England	14:22.24	Q
12	1	Shaun Creighton	Australia	14:23.28	Q
13	1	Alan Bunce	New Zealand	14:26.06	Q
14	1	Reinhold Iita	Namibia	14:30.65	q
15	1	Richard Mavuso	South Africa	14:40.37	q
16	2	Kabo Gabaseme	Botswana	14:40.52	
17	2	Francis Munthali	Malawi	14:42.33	
18	1	Ian Gillespie	Scotland	14:50.34	
19	2	Simon Labiche	Seychelles	14:50.63	
20	2	Ian Carswell	Canada	14:53.78	
21	1	Munusamy Ramachandran	Malaysia	14:57.42	
22	1	Chris Votu	Solomon Islands	16:22.82	
	1	Abel Chimukoko	Zimbabwe	DNS	
	1	Jeff Schiebler	Canada	DNS	
	1	Lefu Sephooa	Lesotho	DNS	

=== Final ===
Rank	Name	Nationality	Time	Notes
1st place, gold medalist(s)	Daniel Komen	Kenya	13:22.57	
2nd place, silver medalist(s)	Tom Nyariki	Kenya	13:28.09	
3rd place, bronze medalist(s)	Richard Limo	Kenya	13:37.42	
4	Karl Keska	England	13:40.24	
5	Keith Cullen	England	13:44.69	
6	Lee Troop	Australia	13:56.32	
7	Kristen Bowditch	England	14:02.36	
8	Alan Bunce	New Zealand	14:02.98	
9	John Morapedi	South Africa	14:06.47	
10	Shadrack Hoff	South Africa	14:19.35	
11	Richard Mavuso	South Africa	14:28.96	
	Jason Bunston	Canada	DNF	
	Reinhold Iita	Namibia	DNF	
	Godfrey Nyombi	Uganda	DNF	
	Shaun Creighton	Australia	DNS	
