= Thomas of Metsoph =

Medieval Armenian chronicler

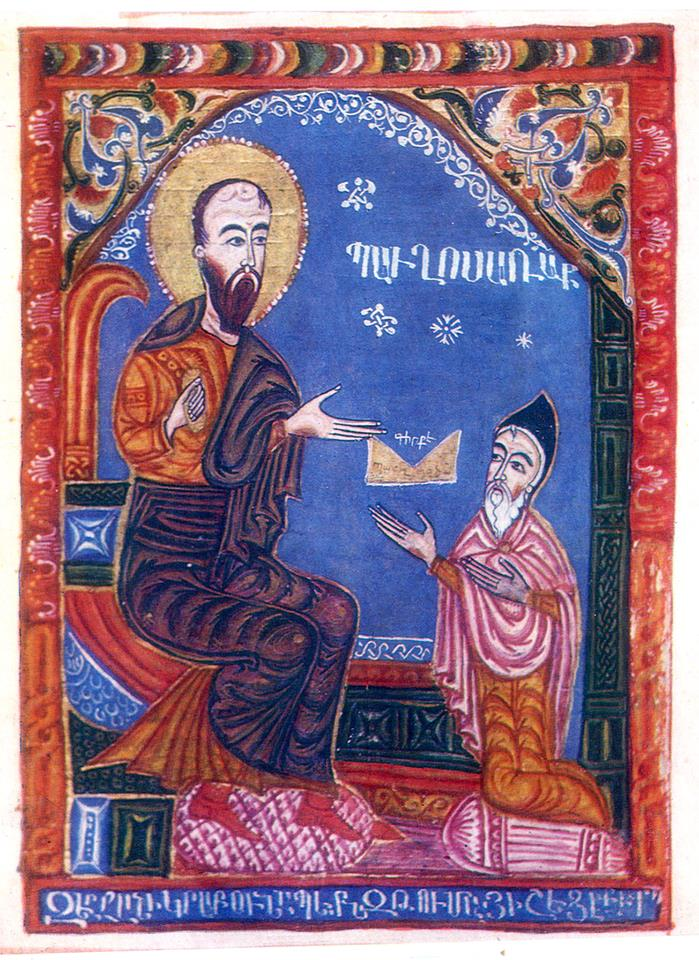
Thomas of Metsop (right) and Paul the Apostle depicted in a miniature from 1435

Thomas of Metsop (Armenian: Թովմա Մեծոփեցի, Thovma Metsopetsi) (1378–1446) was an Armenian cleric and chronicler who left an account of Timur’s invasions of the Caucasus (1386–1403). What we know of Thomas's life comes from a biography written by his student Kirakos Banaser and from a number of 15th-century colophons.

== Biography ==
Born in Aghiovit, north of Lake Van, Thomas received his early education at the monastery of Metsob, northwest of the city of Arjesh (Erciş in modern Turkey). He had to spend a peripatetic life fleeing the repeated attacks of the Timurid and Turkoman armies. He engaged in teaching and literary activity at several religious centers in Armenian, including Sukhara, Tatev, Lim, and Metsoph (also spelled Metsob). He was also involved in the struggle against the influence of Roman Catholicism within the Armenian Church, and helped transfer the Armenian catholicosate from Sis in Cilician Armenia back to Echmiadzin in Greater Armenia (1441). His major work is The History of Timur and His Successors, which is essentially an eyewitness account written for the most part from memory. Although not flawless, it is an important source for Armenia and Georgia in the late 14th and early 15th centuries. The classical Armenian text was published by K. Shahnazarian in Paris in 1860, translated into French by Félix Nève in 1855, and into English by Robert Bedrosian in 1977.

== See also ==
- Timur's invasions of Georgia
- Turkoman invasions of Georgia
