= Athletics at the 1996 Summer Olympics – Men's 10,000 metres =

Men's 10,000 metres at the Games of the XXVI Olympiad
- Venue: Centennial Olympic Stadium
- Dates: 26 July 1996 (heats); 29 July 1996 (final)
- Competitors: 46 from 30 nations
- Winning time: 27:07.34 OR

Medalists
1st place, gold medalist(s)		Haile Gebrselassie; Ethiopia
2nd place, silver medalist(s)		Paul Tergat; Kenya
3rd place, bronze medalist(s)		Salah Hissou; Morocco

Official Video Highlights

These are the official results of the men's 10,000 metres at the 1996 Summer Olympics in Atlanta. The final was held on July 29, 1996. The winning margin was 0.83 seconds.

== Medalists ==
Gold	Haile Gebrselassie; Ethiopia
Silver	Paul Tergat; Kenya
Bronze	Salah Hissou; Morocco

== Records ==
These were the standing world and Olympic records (in minutes) prior to the 1996 Summer Olympics.

World record	26:43.53	(Ethiopia) Haile Gebrselassie	Hengelo (NED)	June 5, 1995
Olympic record	27:21.46	(Morocco) Brahim Boutayeb	Seoul (KOR)	September 26, 1988

Haile Gebrselassie set a new Olympic record with 27:07.34 in the final.

== Ranking ==
=== Final ===
RANK	FINAL	TIME
	Haile Gebrselassie (ETH)	27:07.34
	Paul Tergat (KEN)	27:08.17
	Salah Hissou (MAR)	27:24.67
4.	Aloÿs Nizigama (BDI)	27:33.79
5.	Josphat Machuka (KEN)	27:35.08
6.	Paul Koech (KEN)	27:35.19
7.	Khalid Skah (MAR)	27:46.98
8.	Mathias Ntawulikura (RWA)	27:50.73
9.	Stéphane Franke (GER)	27:59.08
10.	Jon Brown (GBR)	27:59.72
11.	Armando Quintanilla (MEX)	28:09.46
12.	Marko Hhawu (TAN)	28:20.58
13.	Abel Antón (ESP)	28:29.37
14.	Carlos de la Torre (ESP)	28:32.11
15.	Alejandro Gómez (ESP)	28:39.11
16.	Zoltán Káldy (HUN)	28:45.48
17.	Worku Bikila (ETH)	28:59.15
18.	Stefano Baldini (ITA)	29:07.77
19.	Alyan Al-Qahtani (KSA)	DNF
20.	Paul Evans (GBR)	DNF

=== Non-qualifiers ===
RANK	NON-QUALIFIERS	TIME
21	Silvio Guerra (ECU)	28:30.15
22	Abraham Assefa (ETH)	28:32.24
23	Toshinari Takaoka (JPN)	28:38.18
24	Robbie Johnston (NZL)	28:40.60
25	Shaun Creighton (AUS)	28:44.29
26	Alfredo Brás (POR)	28:50.28
27	Katsuhiko Hanada (JPN)	28:52.22
28	Róbert Štefko (SVK)	29:03.80
29	Hendrick Ramaala (RSA)	29:07.81
30	Brad Barquist (USA)	29:11.20
31	Charles Mulinga (ZAM)	29:14.99
32	Carlos Patrício (POR)	29:15.41
33	Miroslav Vanko (SVK)	29:17.53
34	Sean Dollman (IRL)	29:19.03
35	Hamid Sadjadi (IRI)	29:22.65
36	Ronaldo da Costa (BRA)	29:26.58
37	Jeff Schiebler (CAN)	29:47.79
38	Dan Middleman (USA)	29:50.72
39	Mohamed Ezzher (FRA)	29:55.34
40	Martín Pitayo (MEX)	30:32.20
41	Herder Vasquez (COL)	33:26.15
42	Majed Abu Maraheel (PLE)	34:40.50
-	Larbi Zéroual (MAR)	DNF
-	Abdellah Béhar (FRA)	DNF
-	Paulo Guerra (POR)	DNF
-	Todd Williams (USA)	DNF
-	Julian Paynter (AUS)	DNS
-	Yasuyuki Watanabe (JPN)	DNS

== Qualification ==
=== Group 1 ===
Place	Name	Nation	Time	Note
1	Worku Bikila	Ethiopia	27:50,57	Q
2	Paul Tergat	Kenya	27:50,66	Q
3	Mathias Ntawulikura	Rwanda	27:51,69	Q
4	Aloÿs Nizigama	Burundi	27:53,21	Q
5	Salah Hissou	Morocco	27:53,32	Q
6	Stefano Baldini	Italy	27:55,79	Q
7	Abel Antón	Spain	27:56,26	Q
8	Carlos de la Torre	Spain	28:04,14	Q
9	Zoltán Káldy	Hungary	28:13,49	q
10	Marko Hhawu	Tanzania	28:14,08	q
11	Paul Evans	United Kingdom	28:24,39	q
12	Robbie Johnston	New Zealand	28:40,60	
13	Katsuhiko Hanada	Japan	28:52,22	
14	Róbert Štefko	Slovakia	29:03,80	
15	Carlos Patrício	Portugal	29:15,41	
16	Ronaldo da Costa	Brazil	29:26,58	
17	Dan Middleman	United States	29:50,72	
18	Mohamed Ezzher	France	29:55,34	
19	Martín Pitayo	Mexico	30:32,20	
20	Herder Vázquez	Colombia	33:26,15	
21	Majed Abu Maraheel	Palestine	34:40,50	
—	Larbi Zéroual	Morocco	DNF	
—	Julian Paynter	Australia	DNS	
—	Yasuyuki Watanabe	Japan	DNS	

=== Group 2 ===
Rank	Name	Nation	Time	Note
1	Haile Gebrselassie	Ethiopia	28:14,20	Q
2	Josephat Machuka	Kenya	28:14,27	Q
3	Paul Koech	Kenya	28:17,48	Q
4	Jon Brown	Great Britain	28:19,85	Q
5	Alyan Al-Qahtani	Saudi Arabia	28:22,35	Q
6	Khalid Skah	Morocco	28:23,21	Q
7	Stéphane Franke	Germany	28:24,30	Q
8	Armando Quintanilla	Mexico	28:27,28	Q
9	Alejandro Gómez	Spain	28:28,16	q
10	Silvio Guerra	Ecuador	28:30,15	
11	Abraham Assefa	Ethiopia	28:32,24	
12	Toshinari Takaoka	Japan	28:38,18	
13	Shaun Creighton	Australia	28:44,29	
14	Alfredo Brás	Portugal	28:50,28	
15	Hendrick Ramaala	South Africa	29:07,81	
16	Brad Barquist	United States	29:11,20	
17	Charles Mulinga	Zambia	29:14,99	
18	Miroslav Vanko	Slovakia	29:17,53	
19	Sean Dollman	Ireland	29:19,03	
20	Hamid Sajjadi	Iran	29:22,65	
21	Jeff Schiebler	Canada	29:47,79	
—	Abdellah Béhar	France	DNF	
—	Paulo Guerra	Portugal	DNF	
—	Todd Williams	United States	DNF	

== See also ==
- 1995 Men's World Championships 10.000 metres
- 1997 Men's World Championships 10.000 metres
- 1998 Men's European Championships 10.000 metres
