= Hendrick Ramaala =

South African long-distance runner

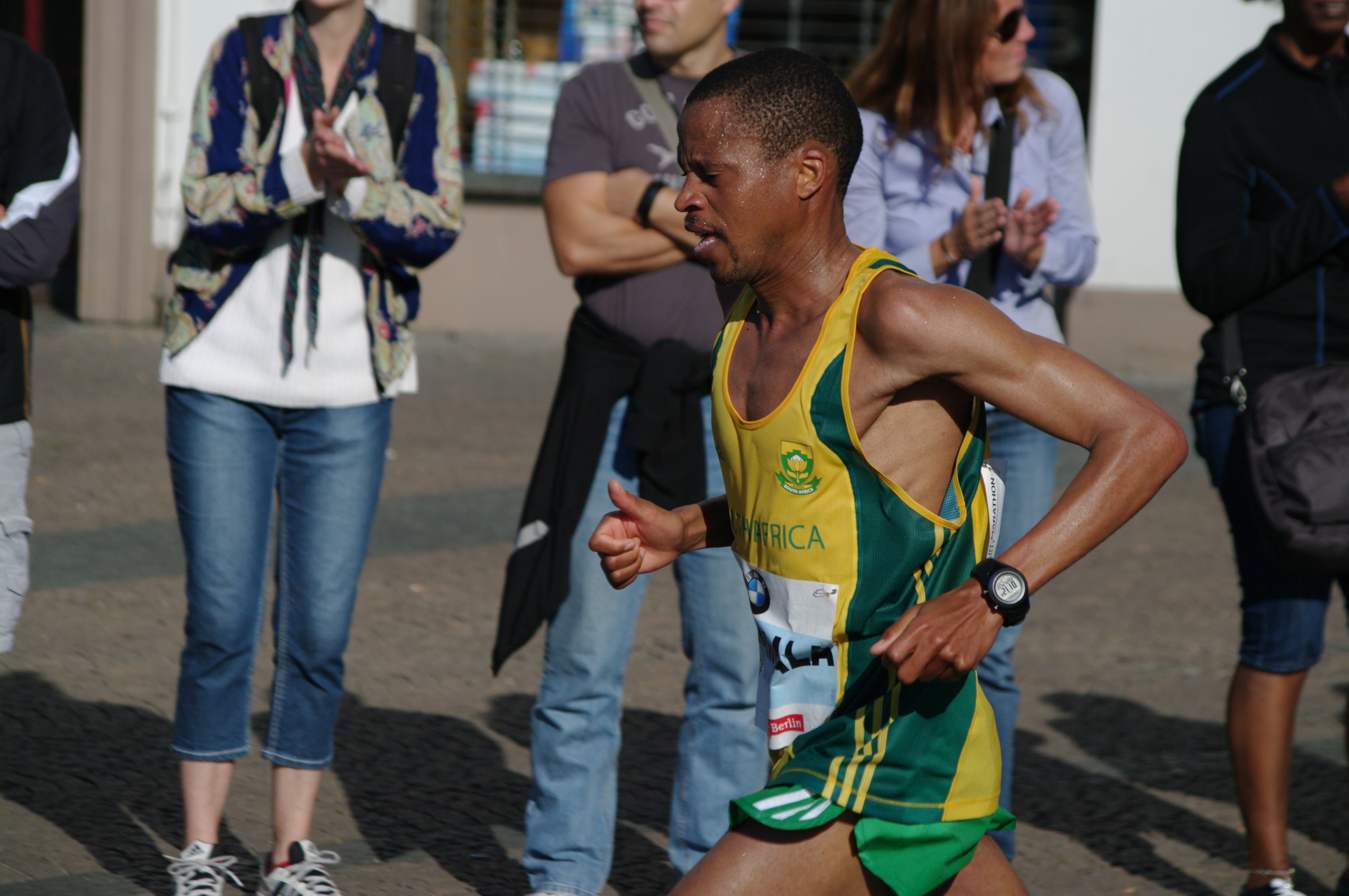
- Ramaala at the Berlin Marathon 2011.
- Born: February 2, 1972 (age 54); Polokwane, South Africa

Hendrik Ramaala (born 2 February 1972) is a South African long-distance runner.

== Biography ==
=== Education ===
Ramaala is a law graduate from the University of the Witwatersrand. He matriculated at St. Bede's secondary school in Ga Molepo area, Polokwane. For his primary education, he went to Subiaco primary in Ga Molepo. His inspiration, Karen from Mitchells Plain, has given him the success that he has today.

=== Running career ===
Ramaala holds the South African 10,000 m record of 27:29.94 which he set in Port Elizabeth on 22 February 1999.

He won the 2004 New York City Marathon and 2004 Mumbai Marathon. He also has two silver medals from the IAAF World Half Marathon Championships in 1998 and 1999. In 2006 he also won the men's Great North and South Runs He is a two-time national champion in the 5.000 metres.

Other competition wins include the Belgrade Race Through History in 1997, the Marseille-Cassis Classique Internationale in 1998, the Lisbon Half Marathon in 2001 and the Portugal Half Marathon in 2003. He has also competed in cross country running and won the Belfast International Cross Country meeting in 1999.

== Achievements ==
Year	Competition	Venue	Position	Event	Notes
Representing South Africa
1995	World Championships	Gothenburg, Sweden	17th	10,000 m	28:00.08
1996	Olympic Games	Atlanta, United States	29th (h)	10,000 m	29:07.81
1997	World Championships	Athens, Greece	14th	10,000 m	28:33.48
1998	Marseille-Cassis Classique Internationale	Marseille, France	1st	Half marathon	1:00:36
1998	World Half Marathon Championships	Zurich, Switzerland	2nd	Half marathon	1:00:24
1999	World Championships	Seville, Spain	11th	10,000 m	28:25.57
1999	World Half Marathon Championships	Palermo, Italy	2nd	Half marathon	1:01:50
2000	London Marathon	London, United Kingdom	5th	Marathon	2:09:43
2000	Olympic Games	Sydney, Australia	12th	Marathon	2:16:19
2001	Lisbon Half Marathon	Lisbon, Portugal	1st	Half marathon	1:00.26
2001	New York City Marathon	New York, United States	5th	Marathon	2:11:18
2002	Paris Marathon	Paris, France	6th	Marathon	2:10:06
2003	World Championships	Paris, France	9th	Marathon	2:10:37
2004	Mumbai Marathon	Mumbai, India	1st	Marathon	2:15:47
2004	Olympic Games	Athens, Greece	—	Marathon	DNF
2004	New York City Marathon	New York, United States	1st	Marathon	2:09:28
2007	World Championships	Osaka, Japan	27th	Marathon	2:26:00
2008	Olympic Games	Beijing, China	44th	Marathon	2:22:43
2011	Berlin Marathon	Berlin, Germany	10th	Marathon	2:16.00

=== Hendrick Ramaala Sports Foundation ===
Olympian Henrick Ramaala has established a non-profit sports foundation called the Hendrick Ramaala Sport Foundation. The foundation's mission is to promote South African distance running to the world. The foundation is based in Johannesburg, where young best middle and long distance South African runners are taken care of in terms of everyday living needs, coaching and training. The foundation's training sessions take place at Zoo Lake, and Wits University sports grounds in Johannesburg.

Sporting positions
Preceded by (Ethiopia) Haile Gebrselassie	Men's Half Marathon Best Year Performance; 2003	Succeeded by (Ethiopia) Dejene Berhanu
