= Assefa Mezgebu =

Ethiopian long-distance runner

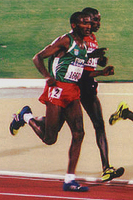

Medal record

Men's athletics

Representing Ethiopia

Olympic Games
Bronze medal – third place	2000 Sydney	10000 m

World Championships
Silver medal – second place	2001 Edmonton	10,000 m
Bronze medal – third place	1999 Seville	10,000 m

World Cross Country Championships
Silver medal – second place	2000 Vilamoura	Long race
Bronze medal – third place	1998 Marrakesh	Long race

All-Africa Games
Gold medal – first place	1999 Johannesburg	10,000 m

World Junior Championships
Gold medal – first place	1996 Sydney	5000 m
Gold medal – first place	1996 Sydney	10,000 m

Assefa Mezgebu (born 19 June 1978 in Sidamo) is an Ethiopian retired long-distance runner, best known for winning a bronze medal in the 10,000 metres event at the 2000 Summer Olympics. He was also the runner-up at the 2001 World Championships in Athletics, following a bronze medal at the 1999 World Championships in Athletics. He also competed in cross-country running and reached the podium at the IAAF World Cross Country Championships in 1998 and 2000.

Assefa Mezgebu is the younger brother of Ayele Mezgebu.

== International competitions ==
Year	Competition	Venue	Position	Event	Notes
Representing Ethiopia
1995	World Championships	Gothenburg, Sweden	14th	10,000 m	27:56.06
1996	World Junior Championships	Sydney, Australia	1st	5000m	13:35.30
1996	World Junior Championships	Sydney, Australia	1st	10,000m	28:27.78
1997	World Championships	Athens, Greece	5th	10,000 m	27:32.48
1998	World Cross Country Championships	Marrakesh, Morocco	3rd	Long race (12 km)	34:28
1999	World Championships	Seville, Spain	3rd	10,000 m	27:59.15
1999	All-Africa Games	Johannesburg, South Africa	1st	10,000 m	28:12.15
2000	World Cross Country Championships	Vilamoura, Portugal	2nd	Long race (12.3 km)	35:01
2000	Summer Olympics	Sydney, Australia	3rd	10,000 m	27:19.75
2001	World Championships	Edmonton, Canada	2nd	10,000 m	27:53.97

== Personal bests ==
- 3,000 metres - 7:28.45 min (1998)
- 5,000 metres - 12:53.84 min (1998)
- 10,000 metres - 26:49.90 min (2002)
