= Janko Benša =

Serbian long-distance runner (born 1977)

Personal information
- Nationality: Serbian
- Born: June 28, 1977 (age 49) Bački Petrovac, Yugoslavia

Sport
- Sport: Track, long-distance running
- Events: 5000 metres, 10,000 metres, half marathon, marathon

Achievements and titles
- Personal bests: 3000m: 7:54.19; 5000m: 13:34.63; 10,000m: 29:00.17 ½ marathon: 1:02:11; Marathon: 2:14:10

Janko Benša (born 28 June 1977) is a Serbian retired distance runner. He was the men's winner of the 2000 Austin Marathon. He competed internationally for Yugoslavia during the 1990s.

== Running career ==
=== Competing for Yugoslavia ===
Benša made his international debut in the junior men's race at the 1995 IAAF World Cross Country Championships, where he placed 77th. In the following year's IAAF World Cross Country junior men's race, he finished in 35th place. Later in 1996, he ran both the 5000 meters and 10,000 meters at the 1996 World Junior Championships in Athletics. On August 21, he finished the men's 10,000 in 19th overall with a time of 29:53.41. On the other hand, the men's 5000 meters had multiple heats from which the top places from each heat would progress to a final round two days later. Benša started in heat #2, running 14:08.34 for fifth place on August 23. Two days later, he finished 10th overall in the final round of the men's 5000 in 14:12.13.

In 1997, he finished in 11th place in the men's 10,000 meters at the European U23 Championships. About a month later, he finished in 15th place in the men's half marathon at the 1997 Summer Universiade. In the fall, he finished the 1997 IAAF World Half Marathon Championships in 1:03:41. At the 1998 IAAF World Half Marathon Championships, he ran a lifetime best of 1:02:11, which was good for 20th place in a deep field. He won the men's race at Yugoslavia's Beli Kros in 1999.

=== Racing in the United States ===
He left for the United States to race professionally. On February 20, 2000, he was entered in the Austin Marathon as a professional pacemaker, but decided in the middle of the race to try finishing and ended up winning. On December 31, 2000, in below-freezing temperatures and strong gusts, he won a four-mile road race organized by NYRR called the New Year's Eve Midnight Run. He finished the race in 19:31 (min:sec), ahead of runner-up Marcus O'Sullivan by 15 seconds. On January 20, 2002, Benša won the men's race in the Carlsbad Marathon, after which he was given $3,000 in prize money. On June 1, 2002, he won the Stillwater Stampede 5-miler in 23:46.47, breaking the course record previously held by 2:10-marathoner Nelson Ndereva Njeru.
