= Félix Nève =

Belgian Orientalist and philologist

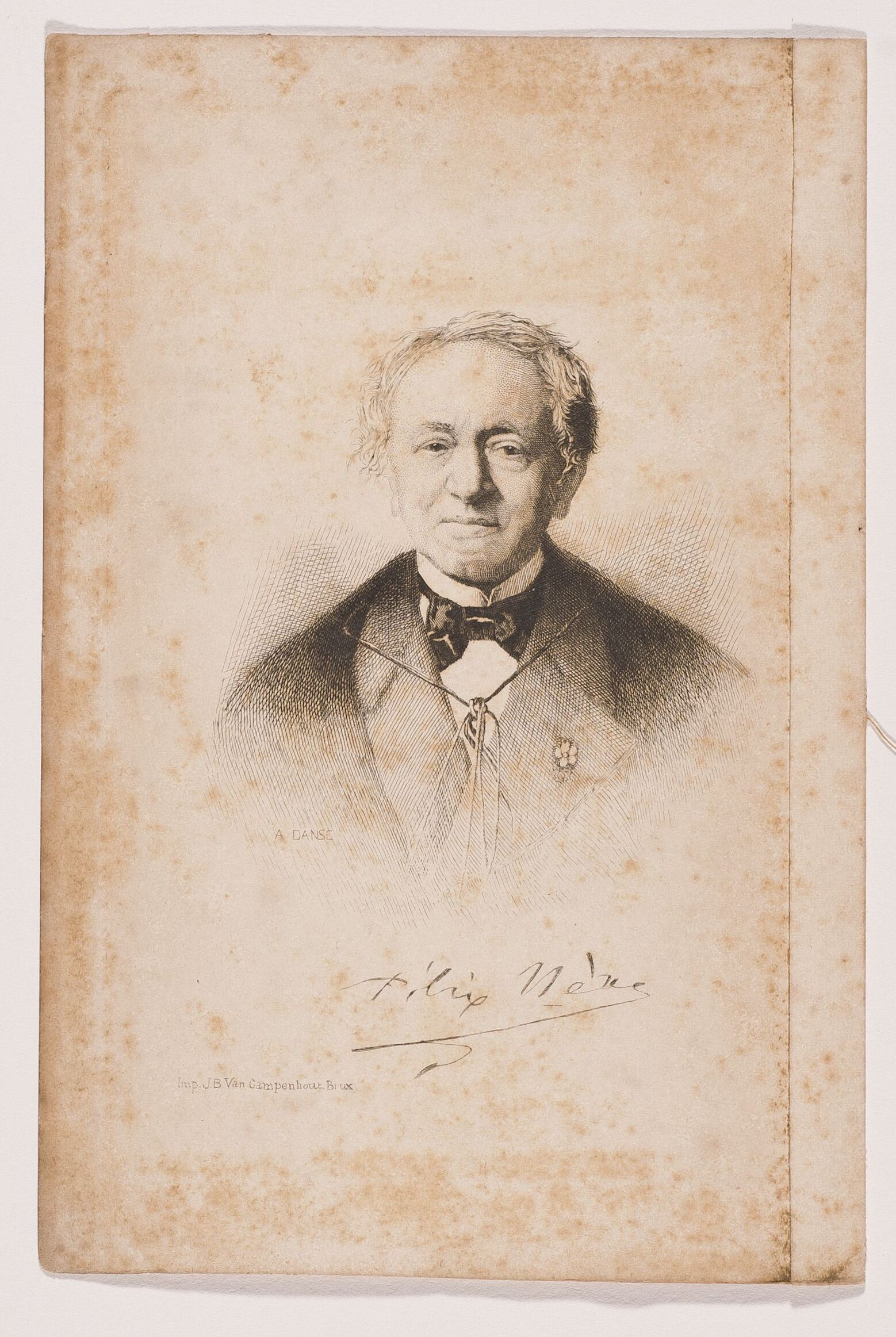
Félix Nève

Félix-Jean-Baptiste-Joseph Nève (born Ath, United Kingdom of the Netherlands, 13 June 1816; died Leuven, 23 May 1893) was an Orientalist and philologist.

== Life ==
His parents were devout Catholics. Having graduated with distinction from the Catholic college of Lille, Nève completed a course of academic studies at the Catholic University of Leuven (French: Louvain), obtaining in 1838 the Degree of Doctor of Philosophy and Letters. His taste for classical and Semitic languages led him to pursue higher studies under some renowned scholars, Professors Lassen of Bonn (1838-1839), Tiersch of Munich (1839-1840), and Burnouf of Paris (1840-1841). He became acquainted with many oriental scholars, some of them already famous, others destined like himself to win fame in after years. Among these were William Muir, H. H. Wilson, Albrecht Weber, Alexander Kuhn, Max Müller, and Karl Joseph Hieronymus Windischmann.

In 1841 Nève was appointed to the chair of Greek and Latin Literature in the University of Leuven, and while teaching the classics, gave a course of studies in the Sanskrit language and literature. This work he kept up for thirty-six years, at the same time making known the results of his studies in books and in the articles contributed to the Journal Asiatique, Annales de Philosophie Chrétienne, Correspondent, and other periodicals. In 1877 he was given the title of professor emeritus, and for the next fifteen years a series of publications came from his pen. He was a member of the Asiatic Society of Paris, the Asiatic Society of London, the Royal Academy of Belgium, and was a Knight of the Order of Leopold.

== Works ==
=== Sanskrit ===
It was Nève who gave the first impetus to the cultivation of Sanskrit studies in Belgium. The most important of his numerous publications in the field are:

- his translation of selected hymns from the Rig Veda, Études sur les hymnes du Rig-Veda, avec un choix d'hymnes traduits pour la première fois en français (Louvain, 1842)
- his study of the ancient Brahmin cult of the Ribhanas, Essai sur le mythe des Ribhanas . . . avec le texte Sanskrit et la traduction française des hymnes addressés à ces divinités (Paris, 1847)
- his translation of Bhavabhuti's drama based on the story of the epic hero Rama, Le dénouement de l'histoire de Rama. Uttara-Rama-Charita, drame de Bhavabhouti, traduit du Sanskrit (Brussels, 1880)
- his collection of essays on the Vedanta philosophy and the epic and dramatic poetry of India, published under the title Epoques littéraires de l'Inde (Brussels, 1883).

=== Armenian ===
Nève also studied the Armenian language and literature. A number of translations and studies based on Armenian texts came from his pen. Among these may be mentioned:

- the Armenian story of the Tatar invasion, Exposé des guerres de Tamerlan et de Schah-Rokh dans l'Asie occidentale, d'après la chronique arménienne inédite de Thomas de Medzoph, published in Mémoires de l'Académie Royale de Belgique (1861)
- the Armenian account of the exploits of Godfrey de Bouillon, Les chefs belges de la première croisade d'après les historiens arméniens (Brussels, 1859)
- the collection of studies on early Christian Armenian prayers and hymns entitled L'Arménie chrétienne et sa littérature (Louvain, 1886).

His publications bearing on philology include his account of the learned men who in the sixteenth and seventeenth centuries worked to build the University of Leuven, La renaissance des lettres et l'essor de l'érudition ancienne en Belgique.

== Bibliography ==
- Ducœur, Guillaume (2021). "Félix Nève (1816-1893) et les études védiques. Poétique du Ṛgveda et apologétique du déluge universel" [Félix Nève (1816–1893) and Vedic Studies. Poetics of the Ṛgveda and Apologetics of the Universal Flood]. In: Courtois, Luc (ed.). Les études orientales à l'Université de Louvain depuis 1834. Hommes et réalisations. Brussels: Éditions Safran, ISBN 978-2-87457-124-4, pp. 73-92.
- Vielle, Christophe (2021). "Indianisme et bouddhisme à Louvain. De Félix Nève à Étienne Lamotte" [Indian and Buddhist Studies at Louvain. From Félix Nève to Étienne Lamotte]. In: Courtois, Luc (ed.). Les études orientales à l'Université de Louvain depuis 1834. Hommes et réalisations. Brussels: Éditions Safran, ISBN 978-2-87457-124-4, pp. 93-116, esp. pp. 94-100.
