= Athletics at the 1997 Summer Universiade – Men's half marathon =

The men's half marathon event at the 1997 Summer Universiade was held on the streets of Catania, Italy on 31 August. This was the first time that this event was featured at the Universiade replacing the marathon.

== Results ==
Rank	Athlete	Nationality	Time	Notes
1st place, gold medalist(s)	Marílson Gomes dos Santos	Brazil	1:03:32	UR
2nd place, silver medalist(s)	Stephen Mayaka	Kenya	1:03:51	
3rd place, bronze medalist(s)	Solomon Wachira	Kenya	1:04:05	
4	Masateru Ikeya	Japan	1:04:12	
5	Sung Keun-oh	South Korea	1:04:37	
6	Mark Steinle	Great Britain	1:04:19	
7	Tshidiso Phofi	South Africa	1:05:11	
8	Kanno Kuniaki	Japan	1:05:11	
9	Christian Leuprecht	Italy	1:05:44	
10	John Maitai Mboroth	Kenya	1:05:51	
11	Juma Nkuwi	Tanzania	1:06:08	
12	Je In-mo	South Korea	1:06:35	
13	Rachid Boulenouar	Morocco	1:06:46	
14	Robert Smits	Netherlands	1:07:09	
15	Janko Benša	Yugoslavia	1:07:28	
16	Ephraim Mokgokhu	South Africa	1:07:36	
17	Adam Leane	Australia	1:07:41	
18	Raúl Ramírez	Mexico	1:08:04	
19	Garrett Crossan	Ireland	1:08:05	
20	Peter de la Cerda	United States	1:08:59	
21	Robert Sadek	Slovakia	1:09:55	
22	Michal Kavacký	Slovakia	1:10:04	
23	Dumitru Bogus	Moldova	1:10:32	
24	Laxman Adhikari	Nepal	1:10:44	
25	James Menon	United States	1:10:54	
26	Berthold Karumendu	Namibia	1:10:59	
27	Wu Wen-chien	Chinese Taipei	1:13:14	
28	Mohamed Abbas	Nigeria	1:13:28	
29	Ng Yu Lun Anson	Hong Kong	1:16:08	
30	Tolessa Teffera	Ethiopia	1:18:54	
31	Mahamedadam Ahmed	Sudan	1:20:02	
	Endalkachew Bezu	Ethiopia	DNF	
	Şükrü Onat	Turkey	DNF	
