= Alfredo Brás =

Portuguese long-distance runner

Personal information
- Nationality: Portuguese
- Born: 26 December 1968 (age 57)

Sport
- Sport: Long-distance running
- Event: 10,000 metres

Alfredo Brás (born 26 December 1968) is a Portuguese long-distance runner. He competed in the men's 10,000 metres at the 1996 Summer Olympics.
