= Robbie Johnston =

New Zealand long-distance runner

Personal information
- Born: 21 August 1967 (age 59) Balclutha, New Zealand

Sport
- Sport: Marathon running

Robert Ian Johnston (born 21 August 1967) is a former long-distance runner from New Zealand who competed twice at the Summer Olympic Games and once at the Commonwealth Games. At the 1992 Summer Olympics in Barcelona he was ninth in his heat of the 5000m and did not advance to the final. At the 1996 Summer Olympics in Atlanta he was 12th in his heat of the 10000m and did not advance to the final. At the 1994 Commonwealth Games in Vancouver he did not finish the 10000m.

Johnston's best international result was fourth in the 5000m metres at the 1994 World Cup in Athletics representing Oceania.

Johnston made national headlines in August 2020 when he was disqualified from the 50-54 age group at the Athletics New Zealand Cross Country Challenge for spitting, breaching strict guidelines due to the COVID-19 rules at the time.

== Personal bests ==
Distance	Time	Place	Date
1500 m	3:39.94	Auckland	22 January 1992
3000 m	7:49.46	Christchurch	14 January 1995
5000 m	13:20.15	Stockholm	8 July 1996
10000 m	27:42.17	Villeneuve-d'Ascq	25 May 1996
Half Marathon	1:03:43	Huntly	15 May 1994
Marathon	2:15:34	London	26 April 1998
