= 2001 World Championships in Athletics – Men's 10,000 metres =

The Men's 10,000 metres event featured at the 2001 World Championships in Edmonton, Alberta, Canada. There were a total number of 28 participating athletes, with the final being held on 8 August 2001.

== Medalists ==
Gold	Charles Kamathi; Kenya (KEN)
Silver	Assefa Mezgebu; Ethiopia (ETH)
Bronze	Haile Gebrselassie; Ethiopia (ETH)

== Records ==
Standing records prior to the 2001 World Athletics Championships
World Record	Haile Gebrselassie (ETH)	26:22.75	June 1, 1998	Hengelo, Netherlands
Event Record	Haile Gebrselassie (ETH)	27:12.95	August 8, 1995	Gothenburg, Sweden
Season Best	Abraham Chebii (KEN)	27:04.20	May 4, 2001	Palo Alto, United States

== Final ==
Rank	Name	Result
Gold medal	Charles Kamathi (KEN)	27:53.25
Silver medal	Assefa Mezgebu (ETH)	27:53.97
Bronze medal	Haile Gebrselassie (ETH)	27:54.41
4.	Yibeltal Admassu (ETH)	27:55.24
5.	Fabián Roncero (ESP)	27:56.07
6.	José Rios (ESP)	27:56.58
7.	Paul Malakwen Kosgei (KEN)	27:57.56
8.	John Cheruiyot Korir (KEN)	27:58.06
9.	Habte Jifar (ETH)	28:02.71
10.	Kamiel Maase (NED)	28:05.41
11.	Jaouad Gharib (MAR)	28:05.45
12.	José Manuel Martínez (ESP)	28:06.33
13.	Jeff Schiebler (CAN)	28:07.06
14.	Marco Mazza (ITA)	28:08.00
15.	Toshinari Takaoka (JPN)	28:13.99
16.	Abderrahim Goumri (MAR)	28:14.06
17.	Teodoro Vega (MEX)	28:14.77
18.	Alan Culpepper (USA)	28:18.44
19.	Abdihakem Abdirahman (USA)	28:34.38
20.	João N'Tyamba (ANG)	28:38.31
21.	Said Berioui (MAR)	28:38.80
22.	Naoki Mishiro (JPN)	28:42.68
23.	Mebrahtom Keflezighi (USA)	28:44.48
24.	Kamal Kohil (ALG)	28:52.47
25.	John Henwood (NZL)	29:01.62
—	Mohammed Mourhit (BEL)	DNF
—	Aloys Nizigama (BDI)	DNF
—	José Ramos (POR)	DNF

== See also ==
- 2000 Men's Olympic 10.000 metres
