= 1998 European Cross Country Championships =

International athletics competition

The 5th European Cross Country Championships were held at Ferrara in Italy on 13 December 1998. Serhiy Lebid took the title in the men's competition and Paula Radcliffe won the women's race.

== Results ==
=== Men individual 9.7 km ===
Pos.	Runners	Time
1st place, gold medalist(s)	(Ukraine) Serhiy Lebid	28:07
2nd place, silver medalist(s)	(Belgium) Mohammed Mourhit	28:08
3rd place, bronze medalist(s)	(France) Driss El Himer	28:16
4.	(Austria) Günther Weidlinger	28:17
5.	(Denmark) Carsten Jørgensen	28:18
6.	(Portugal) Eduardo Henriques	28:25
7.	(Italy) Giuliano Battocletti	28:36
8.	(Spain) Manuel Pancorbo	28:40

79 runners finished

=== Men teams ===
Pos.	Team	Points
1st place, gold medalist(s)	Italy; Giuliano Battocletti; Gabriele De Nard; Umberto Pusterla; Gennaro Di Napoli	53
2nd place, silver medalist(s)	Portugal; Eduardo Henriques; Paulo Guerra; João Junqueira; José Ramos	55
3rd place, bronze medalist(s)	Spain; Manuel Pancorbo; Julio Rey; Martín Fiz; Fabián Roncero	68
4.	United Kingdom	91
5.	France	92
6.	Ireland	108
7.	Belgium	122
8.	Netherlands	126

Total 13 teams

=== Women individual 5.6 km ===
Pos.	Runners	Time
1st place, gold medalist(s)	(United Kingdom) Paula Radcliffe	18:07
2nd place, silver medalist(s)	(Finland) Annemari Sandell	18:10
3rd place, bronze medalist(s)	(Serbia and Montenegro) Olivera Jevtić	18:11
4.	(Portugal) Fernanda Ribeiro	18:19
5.	(Portugal) Helena Sampaio	18:26
6.	(France) Yanna Belkacem	18:42
7.	(Portugal) Albertina Dias	18:46
8.	(Spain) María Luisa Larraga	18:49

60 runners finished

=== Women teams ===
Pos.	Team	Points
1st place, gold medalist(s)	Portugal; Fernanda Ribeiro; Helena Sampaio; Albertina Dias	16
2nd place, silver medalist(s)	France; Yanna Belkacem; Zahia Dahmani; Fatima Yvelain	25
3rd place, bronze medalist(s)	Romania; Cristina Iloc; Constantina Diţă; Luminiţa Gogârlea	41
4.	Spain	54
5.	United Kingdom	55
6.	Germany	71
7.	Belgium	77
8.	Italy	89

Total 12 teams

=== Junior men individual 5.6 km ===
Pos.	Runners	Time
1st place, gold medalist(s)	(Spain) Yousef El Nasri	16:50
2nd place, silver medalist(s)	(Romania) Ovidiu Tat	16:51
3rd place, bronze medalist(s)	(Republic of Ireland) Gareth Turnbull	16:55
4.	(United Kingdom) Sam Haughian	16:57
5.	(Ukraine) Ivan Heshko	17:02
6.	(Sweden) Mustafa Mohamed	17:02
7.	(Spain) Miguel Angel Pinto	17:07
8.	(Portugal) Filipe Pedro	17:11

=== Junior men teams ===
Pos.	Team	Points
1st place, gold medalist(s)	Spain	28
2nd place, silver medalist(s)	United Kingdom	30
3rd place, bronze medalist(s)	Romania	36
4.	Sweden	45
5.	Ukraine	52
6.	Italy	54
7.	Germany	73
8.	Portugal	73

=== Junior women individual 3.6 km ===
Pos.	Runners	Time
1st place, gold medalist(s)	(Hungary) Katalin Szentgyörgyi	11:51
2nd place, silver medalist(s)	(Portugal) Inês Monteiro	11:58
3rd place, bronze medalist(s)	(Serbia and Montenegro) Sonja Stolić	12:03
4.	(Turkey) Sebile Sibel Özyurt	12:04
5.	(Turkey) Tezeta Nuray Surekli	12:09
6.	(Belgium) Tinneke Boonen	12:19
7.	(Slovenia) Sonja Roman	12:20
8.	(Czech Republic) Helena Volná	12:22

=== Junior women teams ===
Pos.	Team	Points
1st place, gold medalist(s)	Turkey	20
2nd place, silver medalist(s)	Belgium	46
3rd place, bronze medalist(s)	Romania	49
4.	Spain	56
5.	Portugal	58
6.	Germany	58
7.	United Kingdom	60
8.	Italy	83
