= Christopher Koskei =

Kenyan long-distance runner (born 1974)

Medal record

Men's athletics

Representing Kenya

World Championships
| Gold medal – first place | 1999 Sevilla | 3000 m st. |
| Silver medal – second place | 1995 Gothenburg | 3000 m t. |

African Championships
| Silver medal – second place | 1993 Durban | 3000 m st. |

Christopher Koskei (also written Kosgei, born 14 August 1974) is a Kenyan runner who specialized in the 3000 metres steeplechase. He became known when he, running barefoot, won the silver medal at 1995 World Championships. After that performance, he was not able to improve his PB, having problems in his training in 1996 and 1997. In 1998 he ran only 8:48 minutes, and decided to stop running.

But at the beginning of October 1998, he met in Iten the Italian coach Renato Canova, in Kenya for the first time together with his manager Gianni Demadonna. After a long talk, he decided to try again, following the new plan from the Italian Coach.

He was able to rebuild his shape, managing a very busy season (with 14 competitions), with the most important peak in the World Championships of Seville, when he became World Champion, four years after the silver in Gothenburg.

He is the elder brother of the current world record holder Stephen Cherono (Saif Saaeed Shaheen), who followed the same coach. Koskei has another brother, Abraham, who likewise follows the family tradition of steeplechasing.

== International competitions ==
| Year | Competition | Venue | Position | Event | Notes |
|---|---|---|---|---|---|
| 1993 | IAAF World Cross Country Championships | | 2nd | Junior race | 20:20 |
| 1993 | IAAF World Cross Country Championships | | 1st | Junior team | 10 pts |
| 1993 | African Championships | Durban, South Africa | 2nd | 3000 m steeplechase | 8:24.58 |
| 1995 | World Championships | Gothenburg, Sweden | 2nd | 3000 m steeplechase | |
| 1999 | World Championships | Seville, Spain | 1st | 3000 m steeplechase | |
| 1999 | All-Africa Games | Johannesburg, South Africa | 3rd | 3000 m steeplechase | |
| 1999 | Military World Games | Zagreb, Croatia | 3rd | 3000 m steeplechase | |

== Personal bests ==
- 3000 metres steeplechase - 8:05.43 (1999)
- 3000 metres - 7:54.75 min (1995)
- 5000 metres - 13:40.17 min (1995)
- 10,000 metres - 28:45.62 min (1996)

== See also ==
- List of World Championships in Athletics medalists (men)
- List of African Games medalists in athletics (men)
- Kenya at the World Championships in Athletics
