= Kamiel Maase =

Dutch long-distance runner

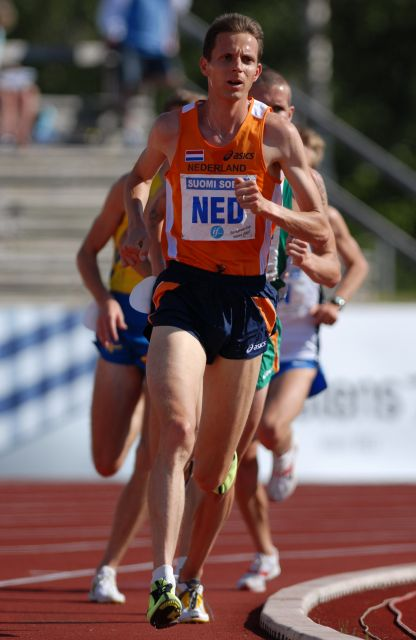
- Kamiel Maase in Europacup 2007

Personal information
- Born: 20 October 1971 (age 54) Nijmegen, Netherlands

Sport
- Sport: Long-distance running Cross-country running
Medal record
Representing Netherlands
Summer Universiade
Gold medal – first place	1997 Catania	10,000m

Kamiel Maase (born 20 October 1971) is a retired long-distance runner from the Netherlands, who is the current Dutch record holder in the 5000 metres and 10,000 metres. He retired in January 2009.

Maase competed for the Texas Longhorns track and field team in the NCAA.

He placed 11th at the 2003 Rotterdam Marathon with a time of 2:10:28.

== International competitions ==
Representing the Netherlands
Year	Competition	Venue	Position	Event	Notes
1997	World Indoor Championships	Paris, France	16th (h)	3000 m	7:54.79
1997	World Championships	Athens, Greece	11th	10,000 m	28:23.30
1997	Universiade	Catania, Italy	1st	10,000 m	28:22.11
1998	European Championships	Budapest, Hungary	8th	10,000 m	28:26.37
1999	World Championships	Seville, Spain	8th	10,000 m	28:15.58
1999	World Half Marathon Championships	Palermo, Italy	13th	Half marathon	1:02:33
2000	Olympic Games	Sydney, Australia	13th	Marathon	2:16:24
2000	European Cross Country Championships	Malmö, Sweden	7th	Men's race	
2001	World Championships	Edmonton, Canada	10th	10,000 m	28:05.41
2001	European Cross Country Championships	Thun, Switzerland	2nd	Men's race	
2002	European Championships	Munich, Germany	5th	5000 m	13:41.42
2002	European Championships	Munich, Germany	9th	10,000 m	28:21.85
2002	European Cross Country Championships	Medulin, Croatia	11th	Men's race	
2003	World Championships	Paris, France	8th	10,000 m	27:45.46
2004	Olympic Games	Athens, Greece	14th	10,000 m	28:23.39
2006	European Championships	Gothenburg, Sweden	9th	Marathon	2:13:46
2008	Olympic Games	Beijing, China	39th	Marathon	2:20:30

Awards
Preceded by Robin Korving	Herman van Leeuwen Cup; 1999; 2001; 2003	Succeeded by Simon Vroemen
Preceded by Simon Vroemen	Herman van Leeuwen Cup; 1999; 2001; 2003	Succeeded by Simon Vroemen
Preceded by Simon Vroemen	Herman van Leeuwen Cup; 1999; 2001; 2003	Succeeded by Chiel Warners
Sporting positions
Preceded by Felix Limo	Men's Zevenheuvelenloop Winner (15 km); 2002	Succeeded by Richard Yatich
