= 1994 World Junior Championships in Athletics – Men's 5000 metres =

The men's 5000 metres event at the 1994 World Junior Championships in Athletics was held in Lisbon, Portugal, at Estádio Universitário de Lisboa on 22 and 24 July.

== Medalists ==
Gold	Daniel Komen; Kenya
Silver	Habte Jifar; Ethiopia
Bronze	Giuliano Battocletti; Italy

== Results ==
=== Final ===
24 July

Rank	Name	Nationality	Time	Notes
1st place, gold medalist(s)	Daniel Komen	Kenya	13:45.37	
2nd place, silver medalist(s)	Habte Jifar	Ethiopia	13:49.70	
3rd place, bronze medalist(s)	Giuliano Battocletti	Italy	13:51.16	
4	Pablo Olmedo	Mexico	13:55.19	
5	Kenji Takao	Japan	14:02.55	
6	Samir Moussaoui	Algeria	14:03.75	
7	Benoît Zwierzchiewski	France	14:04.34	
8	Valeriy Kuzman	Russia	14:04.50	
9	Angelo Pacheco	Portugal	14:06.17	
10	Tekalegne Shewaye	Ethiopia	14:10.07	
11	Ko Jung-Won	South Korea	14:15.33	
12	David Galindo	Mexico	14:17.44	
13	Darrius Burrows	United Kingdom	14:35.10	
14	Wataru Okutani	Japan	14:45.74	
	Simone Zanon	Italy	DNS	

=== Heats ===
22 July

==== Heat 1 ====
Rank	Name	Nationality	Time	Notes
1	Habte Jifar	Ethiopia	14:27.48	Q
2	Kenji Takao	Japan	14:27.92	Q
3	Simone Zanon	Italy	14:28.02	Q
4	Angelo Pacheco	Portugal	14:28.17	Q
5	Benoît Zwierzchiewski	France	14:28.44	Q
6	Darrius Burrows	United Kingdom	14:29.12	q
7	Samir Moussaoui	Algeria	14:34.88	q
8	David Galindo	Mexico	14:36.38	q
9	David Chelule	Kenya	15:23.38	
10	Assounane Dan Kassoua	Niger	15:45.77	
11	Tsiliso Raletsatsi	Lesotho	15:46.78	
	Ahmed Safed	Palestine	DNF	

==== Heat 2 ====
Rank	Name	Nationality	Time	Notes
1	Daniel Komen	Kenya	13:52.42	Q
2	Pablo Olmedo	Mexico	14:04.73	Q
3	Valeriy Kuzman	Russia	14:04.78	Q
4	Wataru Okutani	Japan	14:05.90	Q
5	Ko Jung-Won	South Korea	14:06.89	Q
6	Tekalegne Shewaye	Ethiopia	14:09.72	q
7	Giuliano Battocletti	Italy	14:13.76	q
8	Awad Saleh Nasser	Yemen	14:40.19	
9	Moussa Mahamoud	Djibouti	15:09.67	
10	Kyaw Aye Lwin	Myanmar	15:23.35	
	Manuel Magalhães	Portugal	DNF	

== Participation ==
According to an unofficial count, 23 athletes from 17 countries participated in the event.

- Algeria (1)
- Djibouti (1)
- Ethiopia (2)
- France (1)
- Italy (2)
- Japan (2)
- Kenya (2)
- Lesotho (1)
- Mexico (2)
- Myanmar (1)
- Niger (1)
- Palestine (1)
- Portugal (2)
- Russia (1)
- South Korea (1)
- United Kingdom (1)
- Yemen (1)
