= Mohamed Ezzher =

French long-distance runner

Mohamed Ezzher (born 26 April 1960 in Khouribga, Morocco) is a French long distance runner. He represented France in the 10,000 metres at the 1996 Olympics. He also represented France four successive times at the IAAF World Championships in Athletics doing the 5,000 in 1995, the 10,000 in 1997, 1999 and the Marathon in 2001.

As a junior runner, he represented his native country of Morocco at the 1981 World Cross Country Championships. His career shows no results through most of the typically peak running years of an athlete, their 20s. After undergoing a change in eligibility, he represented France first in the 1993 IAAF World Half Marathon Championships then in many cross country International championships; the 1994 and 1996 European Cross Country Championships and the 1994, 1997, 1999 and 2000 IAAF World Cross Country Championships.

Just months after the 2000 Cross Country meet, on 3 July, Ezzher ran the 5,000 metres in Sotteville in 13:43.15. The time beat the masters M40 world record that had been held by Frenchman Lucien Rault for 24 years. He has held that record since that date. No other man has come within much more than 10 seconds of his time.

On 8 April 2001 Ezzher broke the Masters M40 marathon world record progression time at the Paris Marathon, running 2:10:32, breaking the record set by John Campbell at the 1990 Boston Marathon. Ezzher's Masters M40 marathon record was broken 2 years later by Andrés Espinosa.
