= Ga-Molepo =

- Location within Limpopo Location within South Africa
- Coordinates: 24.033°S 29.799°E
- Country: South Africa
- Province: Limpopo
- District: Capricorn
- Municipality: Polokwane

Area
  - Total: 5.43 km^{2} (2.10 sq mi)

Population (2011)
  - Total: 4,048
  - Density: 745/km^{2} (1,930/sq mi)

Racial makeup (2011)
  - Black African: 99.9%

First languages (2011)
  - Northern Sotho: 91.6%
  - English: 5.5%
  - Other: 2.9%
- Time zone: UTC+2 (SAST)
- Area code: 015

Ga-Molepo is a town in the Capricorn District Municipality and the Polokwane Local Municipality in the Limpopo province of South Africa. Ga-Molepo is constituted of approximately thirty villages.

== History ==
The term "Molepo" signifies a place or a moment of tranquility in the South African language of Sesotho sa Leboa, which is spoken by the majority of Ga-Molepo's inhabitants. Historically, The Molepo are khalangas bakgalaka sotho and Tswana mixture their totem animal is tlou (elephant)they moved from Tzaneen and settled at the current location ga Molepo separate with chief makgoba upon the arrival found the bashega clan ruled by Sehlapelo sa boshega a Moshoeshoe their totem animal it’s nare (buffalo).

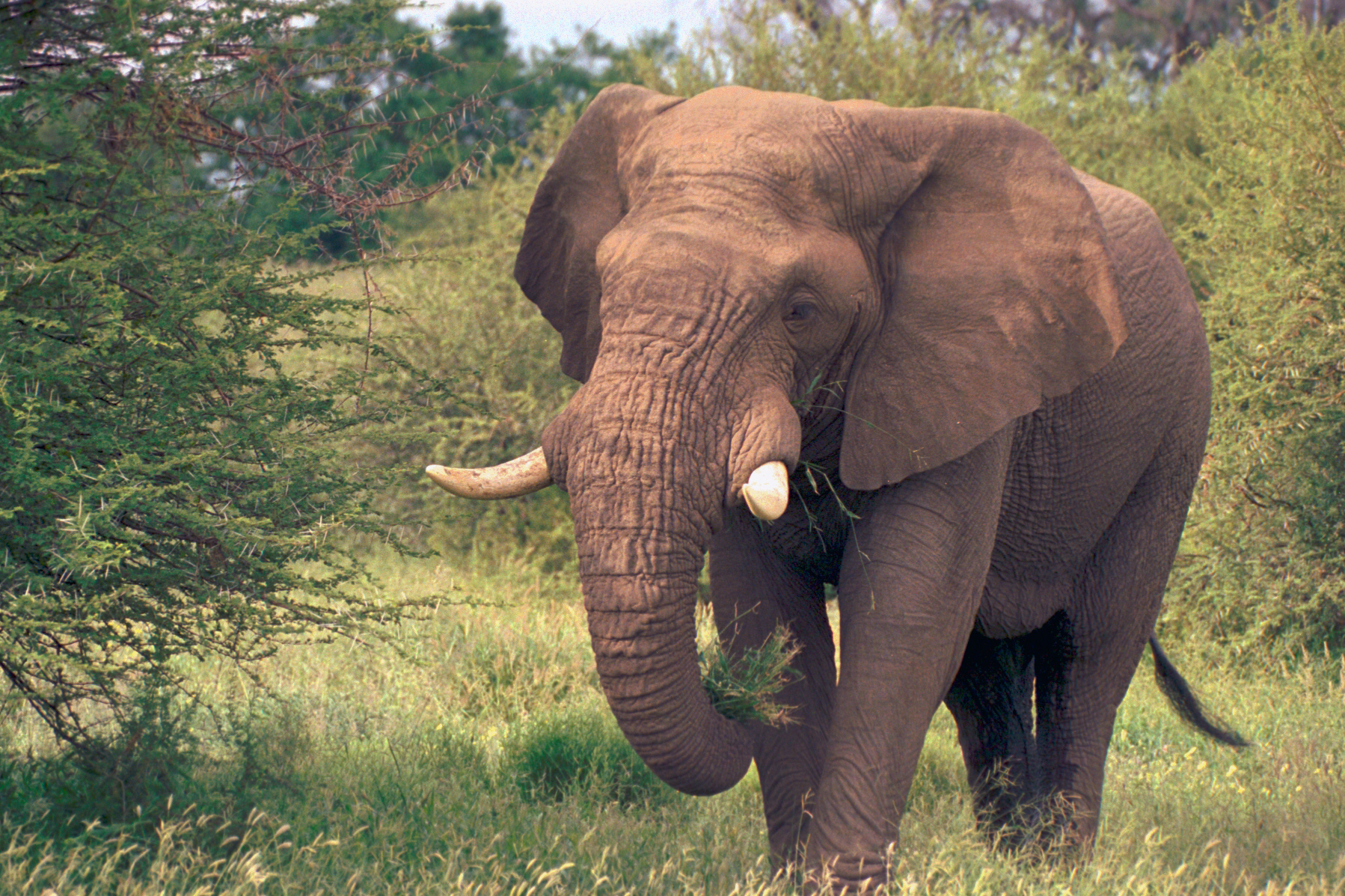
Tlou setumula megaba tlouwana tsa xala dija kgabane ka sefateng sa meditsana ya Boshega

Mphafudi Molepo , from Molepo wa Thaba, is remembered in oral tradition as a prominent royal figure. His elder brother was Kgoshi Mamphoko Makgoba, and his younger brother was Mathabatha Kape.

Mphafudi had one child With a wife who the son was Modikana, with his other wife who was Ngwana Tjale (Ntlala), who was from a royal lineage, he had eight children. Among the children of Ngwana Tjale was a son named Mmathata, the third-born child and first son of that marriage. He inherited the name of his grandfather. Mmathata married Ngwatladi known as Kgoshi ya Mosadi, the daughter of Kgoshi Maisha /Setlakalane. Royal custom required that royalty marry into royalty. Mmathata and Ngwatladi had four children named Modikana (their first-born son, who died while in his school years), Mogotladi, Ngwanamohuba, and Mmapitsi.

The royal house, Kgoro ya Molepo wa Thaba, delayed appointing a new king while internal matters were being settled. During this transitional period, Maisha/Setlakalane assumed leadership responsibilities. According to the tradition reflected in this account, the rightful kingship of Ga Molepo is held by the line of Molepo wa Thaba. The community associated with Molepo wa Thaba is sometimes identified with the name Baepo, described as “the iron people,” known for gold mining activities. They are also linked in oral tradition to Vhangona and Vhampezdi of Mapungubwe, and to the Munhumutapa (Monomotapa) of Great Zimbabwe.

According to Kalanga oral tradition, Mukalanga the Great, an early Kalanga ruler, resided in the Great Lakes region. His people later migrated south of the Zambezi River. The group is associated with water symbolism and rain-making rituals. A patriarch named Mbedzi (Mpedi) is described as rising to prominence within the tribe. The community is also linked with the leopard (Nengwe) symbolism and what is described as the Konje culture. Other associated names include Moroka a Meetse a Pula Mokgalaka. The nation is sometimes described symbolically as "A sun of righteousness rising and shining upon Africa — the birth of a new civilization arising from the ashes of ancient African civilizations, including Ethiopian and Egyptian pyramids". Oral tradition mentions a "fallen star" in the village, compared symbolically to the biblical star from the East (Matthew 2:1–10). The people are described as Bakgalaka a Dingotlo, characterized by a distinctive hairstyle: shaved on the sides with hair left at the front edge of the forehead, hence the name Makgaka a Dingotlo.

The community is said to share ancestral links with the Bhuba family, associated with the Lemba group who migrated from Zimbabwe and settled near Phusela, close to Lenyenye (Tzaneen); Kgoshi Makgoba; Mathabatha; Nengwekhulu; Rapitswana Rabothatha; Modjadji; Mamabolo; Masopha; Moshoeshoe. These traditions portray the group as rain-makers and as "wise people from the East", sometimes referred to as Bakalanga/Bakgalaka, or "sun people".

== Geography ==
Ga-Molepo is surrounded by the Lebopo mountains, and through it runs several rivers: Mphogodiba, Hlabashane, Mokgotla and Mmamatebele.

== Religion ==
Although the majority of people in Ga Molepo believe in African Traditional Religion, the town's leadership has always been open to people from different religions especially the Zion Christian Church which is the dominant and a church with a large following. Apart from welcoming the arrival of the Roman Catholic Church missionaries, who settled at Subiaco Mission in Ga Rampheri, the leadership of Ga Molepo has been in contact with missionaries from as far as the Kingdom of Lesotho as early as 1873.

The Dutch reformed church also established a mission station at Bethel village, and the residents of the community are members of the church.

There are also three strong Pentecostal churches at Ga Molepo, Strong tower bible church established and founded by Bishop Phologa James Makgatho from Dihlopaneng village, Assemblies of Christ, established and founded by Bishop EM Molepo, and also the Assemblies of God, based in Laastehoop established under the leadership of Pastor Nyatlo.

== Tourist attractions ==
It is the home of the biggest Zion Christian Church (ZCC) church situated at one of the villages called Boyne, one of the villages is Ga-Rampheri where there is a Molepo dam in the Mphogodiba River. At Molepo dam, every festive season residents gather to celebrate the festivities with much entertainment, DJs playing and entertaining crowds.

== Notable residents ==
- John Mpe, incumbent mayor of Capricorn district municipality and Polokwane local municipality.
- Phaswane Mpe, author of Welcome to Our Hillbrow, a novel which deals with issues of xenophobia, AIDS, tradition, and inner city status in the Hillbrow neighborhood of post-apartheid Johannesburg. Mpe was also a lecturer of African Literature at the University of the Witwatersrand.
- Hoseah Kgadimonyane Tjale, He is a former Comrade marathon runner who participated in several races and has gold, silver and bronze medals, he hails from Ga Mogano, under Kgoshi Mogano, Bobirwa, Totomeng.He won the Two Oceans Marathon, an ultra-Marathon (56 km), in 1980. He came second in the Comrades Marathon, an ultra-Marathon (90 km), in 1985 and 1990 and came 3rd in 1986 and 1987. He participated in the London to Brighton ultra-marathon (56 Miles), which he won in 1985.
- Former Athletics South Africa (ASA) president Leonard Chuene comes from Ga Mmakata.
