= David Chelule =

Kenyan long-distance runner (1977–2026)

David Chelule (7 July 1977 – 6 November 2026) was a Kenyan long-distance runner who specialized in the half marathon, having run the 5000 and 10,000 metres earlier in his career.

His cousin Julius also participated at the World Junior Championships in Sydney, and won a gold medal in the 3000 metres steeplechase.

Chelule died on 6 November 2026, at the age of 49.

== Achievements ==
Year	Competition	Venue	Position	Event	Notes
Representing Kenya
1994	World Junior Championships	Lisbon, Portugal	19th (h)	5000m	15:23.38
1996	World Junior Championships	Sydney, Australia	2nd	5000 m	13:36.27
1996	World Junior Championships	Sydney, Australia	2nd	10,000 m	28:29.14
1999	All-Africa Games	Johannesburg, South Africa	2nd	10,000 m	28:13.71
2000	Olympic Games	Sydney, Australia	5th	5000 m	13:37.13

=== Personal bests ===
- 3000 metres - 7:37.36 min (1999)
- 5000 metres - 12:57.79 min (1999)
- 10,000 metres - 27:32.18 min (1996)
- Half marathon - 1:02:08 hrs (2000)
