= Daniel Komen =

Kenyan runner

Personal information
- Full name: Daniel Kipngetich Komen
- Born: 17 May 1976 (age 50) Mwen, Kenya
- Height: 170 cm (5 ft 7 in)
- Weight: 55 kg (121 lb)

Sport
- Country: Kenya
- Sport: Athletics
- Events: Middle-, Long-distance running
Medal record
Men's Athletics
Representing Kenya
World Championships
Gold medal – first place	1997 Athens	5000 m
African Championships
Gold medal – first place	1998 Dakar	5000 m
Commonwealth Games
Gold medal – first place	1998 Kuala Lumpur	5000 m
World Junior Championships
Gold medal – first place	1994 Lisbon	5000 m
Gold medal – first place	1994 Lisbon	10,000 m
African Junior Championships
Gold medal – first place	1994 Algiers	5000 m
World Cross Country Championships
Gold medal – first place	1994 Budapest	U20 team
Gold medal – first place	1998 Marrakesh	Short race team
Silver medal – second place	1994 Budapest	U20 race
Silver medal – second place	1998 Marrakesh	Short race
Representing Africa
World Cup
Gold medal – first place	1998 Johannesburg	5000 m

Daniel Kipngetich Komen (born 17 May 1976) is a Kenyan middle- and long-distance runner. Remembered for his rivalry with Haile Gebrselassie, his most notable achievements came in a two-year period between 1996 and 1998, during which he broke a string of world records.

Komen held the world record in the 3000 metres for nearly 28 years, with a time of 7:20.67 set in 1996. Komen also held the world best in the two mile run for nearly 26 years. With his time of 7:58.61 set in 1997, he, along with Jakob Ingebrigtsen, are the only two men in history to average two miles at a sub-four-minute mile pace. Komen's splits were 3:59.4 on both the first and second half of the race. He is also the Kenyan record holder for the 5000 metres both outdoors and indoors.

Komen was the second man, after Saïd Aouita, to break the 3 1/2-minute mark for the 1500 m, the 7 1/2-minute mark for 3000 m, and the 13-minute mark for the 5000 m.

== Early life ==
Komen was born in Elgeyo Marakwet District. He is from the Keiyo sub-tribe of Kalenjin people and grew up in a rural area of Kenya's Rift Valley Province. One of fourteen children, Komen began running at the age of seven as a means of getting to and from school. His running abilities were discovered and at the age of 14 he travelled to Australia. Komen had an exceptional junior career: at age 17, he placed second at the World Junior Cross Country Championships, and in 1994, he became the World Junior Champion in the 5,000 meters and 10,000 meters.

== Career ==
Komen first appeared in the senior ranks in 1994 when he won a place on Kenya's 10,000 m team for the 1994 Commonwealth Games, placing ninth. The next year, at the Golden Gala meet in Rome, Komen set the world junior record in the 5,000m with a time of 12:56.15, helping pace Moses Kiptanui to a world record in the process.

In 1996, Komen began to dominate the 5,000 m. On 1 September 1996 in Rieti, Italy, Komen ran a spectacular world record time of 7:20.67 in the 3000 metres, breaking Noureddine Morceli's former record by 4.44 seconds. Komen's record stood untouched for nearly 28 years, with Hicham El Guerrouj's 1999 time of 7:23.09 being over two seconds behind Komen. Jakob Ingebrigtsen would break the record on 25 August 2024, clocking 7:17.55 to become the first man under 7:20.

A year later, on 19 July 1997, Komen made history again. In Hechtel, Belgium, he became the first man to run two miles in under eight minutes, clocking a world best of 7:58.61. His first mile was faster than Roger Bannister's first-ever sub-four, while his second equalled it. Just seven months later, at an Australian athletics meet in Sydney, Komen ran 7:58.91, missing his world best by 0.30 seconds. This performance makes Komen the only man in history to break 8 minutes in the two mile more than once. His 7:58.61 world best in the two mile stood for nearly 26 years, until 9 June 2023 when Jakob Ingebrigtsen ran 7:54.10.

In August 1997 he broke the 5000 m world record and took two seconds off of Haile Gebrselassie's best to bring it to 12:39.74.

Only twelve days after the previous world record of 7:26.15 was set by Haile Gebrselassie, Komen broke the indoor 3,000-metre record with a time of 7:24.90, set in Budapest on 6 February 1998. This mark was referred to as "Mount Everest" in athletics circles and had been bettered only twice outdoors, one of them being Komen's own world record. Kenenisa Bekele believed that breaking Komen's record was only "possible on a special day if the pace is good and if everything else also is perfect." This mark, having stood for more than 25 years, was bettered on 15 February 2023 by Ethiopia's Lamecha Girma with a time of 7:23.81 in the Meeting Hauts-de-France Pas-de-Calais in Lievin. Spain's Mohamed Katir also went under Komen's previous record with a time of 7:24.68.

Other accolades include being the 1997 World Championships in Athletics and 1998 Commonwealth Games 5,000-meter champion. He won the 5000 metres race at the 1998 IAAF World Cup.

Out of the limelight since the late 1990s, Komen now serves as chairman of the Keiyo North Rift Athletics Association and as co-director of a private school with his wife, Joyce.

== Achievements ==
=== Personal bests ===
Daniel Komen's personal bests, and their place on the world ranking of all times, unless otherwise noted. All times and placings are taken from Komen's World Athletics bio (as of September 2024).

Distance	Time	All-Time Rank	Date	Place
1500 metres	3:29.46	31st	16 August 1997	Monaco
Mile	3:46.38	8th	26 August 1997	Berlin
2000 metres	4:51.30	17th	5 June 1998	Milan
3000 metres	7:20.67	2nd, AR, NR	1 September 1996	Rieti
3000 metres indoor	7:24.90	3rd	6 February 1998	Budapest
Two miles	7:58.61	2nd	19 July 1997	Hechtel
5000 metres	12:39.74	6th, NR	22 August 1997	Brussels
5000 metres indoor	12:51.48	3rd, NR	19 February 1998	Stockholm
10,000 metres	27:38.32	479th*	30 August 2002	Brussels

=== International competitions ===
Representing Kenya
Year	Competition	Venue	Position	Event	Result
1994	World Cross Country Championships	Budapest, Hungary	2nd	U20 race	24:17
1994	World Cross Country Championships	Budapest, Hungary	1st	U20 team	18 pts
1994	African Junior Championships	Algiers, Algeria	1st	5000 m	13:31.10
1994	World Junior Championships	Lisbon, Portugal	1st	5000 m	13:45.37
1994	World Junior Championships	Lisbon, Portugal	1st	10,000 m	28:29.74
1997	World Championships	Athens, Greece	1st	5000 m	13:07.38
1998	World Cross Country Championships	Marrakesh, Morocco	2nd	Short race	10:46
1998	World Cross Country Championships	Marrakesh, Morocco	1st	Short race team	10 pts
1998	African Championships	Dakar, Senegal	1st	5000 m	13:35.70
1998	World Cup	Johannesburg, South Africa	1st	5000 m	13:46.57
1998	Commonwealth Games	Kuala Lumpur, Malaysia	1st	5000 m	13:22.57

== Bibliography ==
- Tanser, Toby (2001) [1997]. Train Hard, Win Easy: The Kenyan Way (2nd ed.). Mountain View: Tafnews Press. ISBN 0-911521-60-7.

Records
Preceded by Noureddine Morceli	Men's 3000 m World Record Holder; 1 September 1996 – 25 August 2024	Succeeded by Jakob Ingebrigtsen
Preceded by Haile Gebrselassie	Men's 5000 m World Record Holder; 22 August 1997 – 13 June 1998	Succeeded by Haile Gebrselassie
Sporting positions
Preceded by Moses Kiptanui	Men's 3000 m Best Year Performance; 1996	Succeeded by Haile Gebrselassie
Preceded by Haile Gebrselassie	Men's 5000 m Best Year Performance; 1996 – 1997	Succeeded by Haile Gebrselassie
