= Brad Barquist =

American long-distance runner

Bradley N. Barquist (born 1968) is an American former long-distance runner who represented the United States at the men's 10,000 meters at the 1996 Summer Olympics. He finished 30th overall as a non-qualifier, with a time of 29:11.20.

Barquist competed for the Michigan Wolverines track and field team in the NCAA.

He was also a coach for the Interlake High School cross country and track teams. He is a key member of Discount Ski Team, who as of March 12, 2018, became the back-to-back champions of CityLeague Friday night racing at Alpental.
