= Dan Middleman =

American long-distance runner

Personal information
- Nationality: American
- Born: October 19, 1969 (age 56) Westbury, New York, United States

Sport
- Sport: Long-distance running
- Event: 10,000 metres

Dan Middleman (born October 19, 1969) is an American long-distance runner. He competed in the men's 10,000 metres at the 1996 Summer Olympics.

He competed in the 1997 Maccabiah Games, in Israel.
