= Viktor Golubev =

Soviet aviator (1915–1945)

Viktor Maksimovich Golubev
- Виктор Максимович Голубев
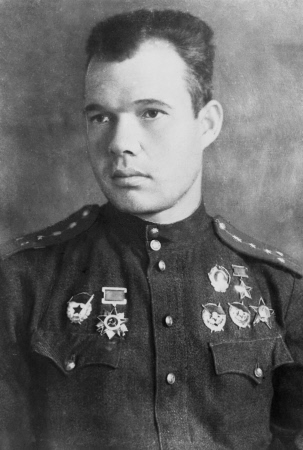
- Born: 17 January [O.S. 4 January] 1915; Petrograd, Russian Empire
- Died: 17 May 1945 (aged 30); Moscow, Soviet Union
- Military career
- Allegiance: Soviet Union
- Branch: Soviet Air Force
- Service years: 1936–1945
- Rank: Guard Major
- Unit: 58th Guards Attack Aviation Regiment
- Conflicts: World War II
- Awards: Hero of the Soviet Union (twice)

Viktor Maksimovich Golubev (Russian: Виктор Максимович Голубев; 17 January [O.S. 4 January] 1915 – 17 May 1945) was a pilot in the 58th Guards Attack Aviation Regiment of the Soviet Air Force during the Great Patriotic War. He was twice declared a Hero of the Soviet Union before his death in a training flight on 17 May 1945.

== Early life ==
Golubev was born on 17 January [O.S. 4 January] 1915 to a Russian family in Petrograd. His family moved to Uglich in 1918, where he remained until completing his initial schooling in 1932. He then went to a trade school in his home town, where he held several jobs as a mechanic before graduating from the aeroclub in 1936. In October he joined the military, where he worked as a mechanic the 7th NKVD Aviation Detachment. After graduating from the Kharkov Military School of Border and Internal Troops in September 1939, he went on to study at the Engels Military Aviation School. Upon graduating from Engels in October 1940 he was assigned to the 209th Bomber Aviation Regiment.

== World War II ==
Upon the start of Operation Barbarossa, Golubev entered combat as part of the defense of the Western Front. He flew seven sorties on the Su-2 before he was injured and sent to the rear of the front to retrain to fly the Il-2. During one of his missions with the 209th Bomber Regiment, on 26 July 1941, his gunner was killed when the plane was shot down by the enemy, but Golubev survived with injuries to his leg and neck. Having managed to land on safe territory, he was taken to a medical battalion and treated for his injuries, but when he returned to his unit a few days later it turned out that the commander of his regiment had already sent a death notice to his family, believing him to be dead. He was soon sent to Voronezh to be retrained to fly the Ilyushin Il-2. After completing training he was appointed as a flight commander in the 285th Attack Aviation Regiment. On 15 May 1942 he was first nominated for the title Hero of the Soviet Union for having flown 100 sorties on the Il-2; the title was awarded on 12 August, after he had been sent to retrain to fly the two-seater Il-2. On 10 September he returned to the front to fight in the Battle of Stalingrad. During the battle he missions attacking enemy warehouses, tanks, vehicles, and weapons; he sometimes made as many as four sorties per day. In January 1943 he took out six transport aircraft on the ground over a period of five days. That month he flew in an attack that was personally ordered by Major General Sergey Rudenko. In February the 285th Regiment was honored with the guards designation and renamed as the 58th Guards Attack Aviation Regiment. The unit was one of the first to become equipped with the PTAB, a 5.5 pounds (2.5 kg) anti-tank bomb; the new bomb was more effective in penetrating the armor of German tanks; Golubev became one of the first pilots to drop the new bomb on a tank column in the Battle of Kursk. For his actions in that battle as squadron commander and for flying an additional 148 sorties on the Il-2 after his first nomination he was awarded the title Hero of the Soviet Union again on 24 August 1943.

While he was assigned to combat he flew on the Western, Central, Don, Southwest, and Byelorussian fronts in the battles for Kharkov, Rostov, Kursk, Oryol, Stalingrad, Pripyat, and other cities. In total he flew 150 sorties on the Il-2 and shot down three enemy aircraft in addition to damaging a large amount of enemy equipment on the ground.

In November 1943 he was sent to attend the Air Force Academy in Monino, where he died during a crash of a practice flight in an Il-2 on 17 May 1945 and was buried in the Novodevichy cemetery.

== Awards and honors ==
- Twice Hero of the Soviet Union (12 August 1942 and 24 August 1943)
- Order of Lenin (12 August 1942)
- Two Order of the Red Banner (29 December 1941 and 12 March 1942)
- Order of the Patriotic War 2nd class (10 February 1943)
- Order of the Red Star (3 November 1942)

== Commemoration ==
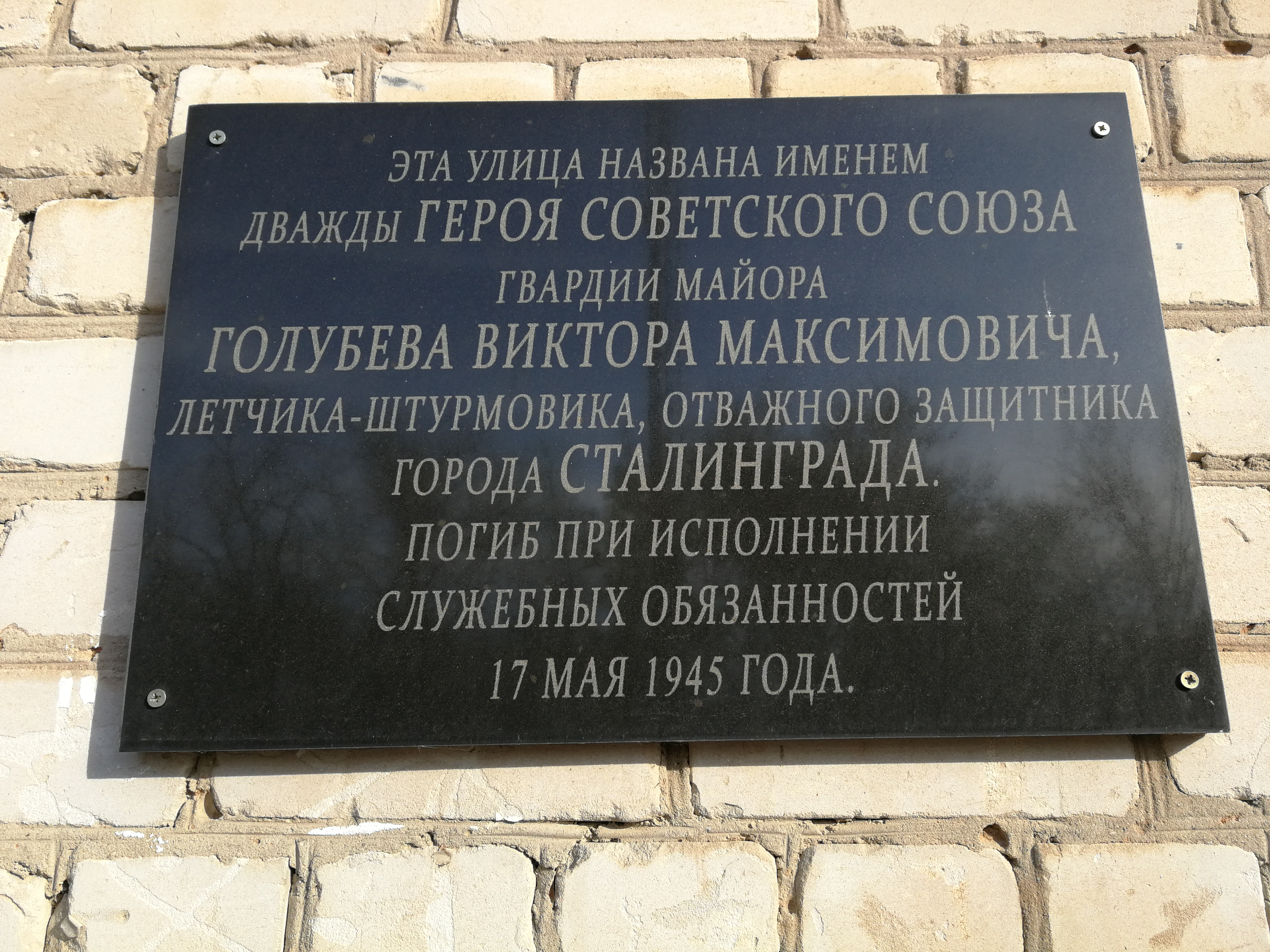
Memorial plaque installed on a residential building in the Krasnoarmeysky District of Volgograd.

In the Hero City of Volgograd, a street in the southern district of the city is named after Golubev, and a memorial plaque has been installed on one of its buildings.

In the Hero City of Leningrad, a bust of twice Hero of the Soviet Union V. M. Golubev has been installed on the Alley of Heroes.

In Uglich, a street is named after Golubev.
