= Giuliano Battocletti =

Italian long-distance runner

Personal information
- Nationality: Italian
- Born: 1 August 1975 (age 51) Cavareno, Trentino, Italy
- Height: 1.76 m (5 ft 9 1/2 in)
- Weight: 54 kg (119 lb)

Sport
- Country: Italy
- Sport: Athletics
- Events: Long-distance running Marathon
- Club: G.S. Valsugana Trentino

Achievements and titles
- Personal bests: 5000 m: 13:20.88 (1999); 10,000 m: 27:45.74 (1999); Half marathon: 1:00:47 (2002); Marathon: 2:11:59 (2005)
Medal record
European Cross Country Championships
Gold medal – first place	1998 Ferrara	Team
Silver medal – second place	2004 Heringsdorf	Team
Event	1st	2nd	3rd
European Cross Country Championships	1	1	0
World Junior Championships	1	0	0

Giuliano Battocletti (born 1 August 1975) is an Italian former long-distance runner.

He is on the top-ten all-time lists for Italy in three specialities (5000 metres, 10,000 metres and half marathon).

== Biography ==
Giuliano Battocletti has won two medals at the International athletics competitions (one at junior level and one with the team). He has 17 caps in national team from 1993 to 2005.

He is the father of long-distance runner Nadia Battocletti, achiever of multiple national records and Olympic medals.

== Doping ==
Battocletti tested positive for nandrolon at Campionato Italiano Maratone on 12 June 1999 and received a 16-month doping ban. before being cleared of the charges.

== Achievements ==
Year	Competition	Venue	Position	Event	Notes
Representing Italy
1994	World Junior Championships	Lisbon, Portugal	3rd	5000m	13:51.16
1998	European Cross Country Championships	Ferrara, Italy	7th	Senior race (9.7 km)	28:36
1998	European Cross Country Championships	Ferrara, Italy	1st	Men teams	53 pts

== National titles ==
Giuliano Battocletti has won 6 times the individual national championship.

- 1 win in 10,000 metres (2005)
- 2 wins in Half marathon (2002, 2007)
- 3 wins in Cross country running (2003, 2004, 2007)

== See also ==
- Italian all-time lists - 5000 metres
- Italian all-time lists - 10000 metres
- Italian all-time lists - Half marathon
