= Habte Jifar =

Ethiopian middle-distance runner

Habte Jifar (born January 29, 1976, in Ambo) is an Ethiopian middle distance runner. He has a total of three medals in the All-African Games. His best performance in a global event was a sixth place at the 1999 World Championships.

== Achievements ==
Year	Competition	Venue	Position	Event	Notes
Representing Ethiopia
1994	World Junior Championships	Lisbon, Portugal	2nd	5000m	13:49.70
1994	World Junior Championships	Lisbon, Portugal	4th	10,000m	29:04.57
1995	All-Africa Games	Harare, Zimbabwe	2nd	5,000 m	13:45.11
1995	All-Africa Games	Harare, Zimbabwe	2nd	10,000 m	28:26.3
1997	World Championships	Athens, Greece	7th	10,000 m	28:00.29
1999	All-Africa Games	Johannesburg, South Africa	3rd	10,000 m	28:15.11
2001	World Championships	Edmonton, Canada	9th	10,000 m	28:02.71
