= Shadrack Hoff =

South African runner

Shadrack Hoff (born 19 May 1973) is a South African runner, twice national men's 5.000 metres champion. He was born in Vryburg.

He finished sixth in 5000 metres at the 1992 World Junior Championships and also at the 2002 IAAF World Half Marathon Championships.

== Personal bests ==
- 5000 metres - 13:14.16 min (1995)
- 10,000 metres - 27:43.89 min (1996)
- Half marathon - 1:01:11 hrs (2000)
- Marathon - 2:11:51 hrs (2005)
