= Toshinari Takaoka =

Japanese long-distance runner

Personal information
- Born: 24 September 1970 (age 55) Yamashiro, Kyoto, Japan

Sport
- Sport: Track and field
Medal record
Representing Japan
Asian Games
Gold medal – first place	1994 Hiroshima	5000 m
Gold medal – first place	1994 Hiroshima	10,000 m
Asian Championships
Gold medal – first place	1998 Fukuoka	5000 m
East Asian Games
Gold medal – first place	1997 Busan	10,000 m
Gold medal – first place	2001 Osaka	5000 m
Summer Universiade
Bronze medal – third place	1993 Buffalo	5000 m

Toshinari Takaoka (高岡 寿成, Takaoka Toshinari; born 24 September 1970) is a Japanese long-distance runner who specializes in the 5000 metres, 10,000 metres and the marathon race. He owned the former men's marathon Asian record.

== International competitions ==
Representing Japan
Year	Competition	Venue	Position	Event	Notes
1994	Asian Games	Hiroshima, Japan	1st	5,000 m	13:38.37
1994	Asian Games	Hiroshima, Japan	1st	10,000 m	28:15.48
1997	East Asian Games	Busan, South Korea	1st	10,000 m	
1997	World Championships	Athens, Greece	DNS	10,000 m	-
1998	Asian Championships	Fukuoka, Japan	1st	5,000 m	
1999	World Championships	Seville, Spain	12th	10,000 m	28:30.73
2000	Olympic Games	Sydney, Australia	15th	5,000 m	13:46.90
2000	Olympic Games	Sydney, Australia	7th	10,000 m	27:40.44
2001	East Asian Games	Osaka, Japan	1st	5000 m	
2001	World Championships	Edmonton, Canada	15th	10,000 m	28:13.99
2001	Fukuoka Marathon	Fukuoka, Japan	3rd	Marathon	2:07:59
2002	Chicago Marathon	Chicago, United States	3rd	Marathon	2:06:16
2005	Tokyo International Marathon	Tokyo, Japan	1st	Marathon	2:07:41
2005	World Championships	Helsinki, Finland	4th	Marathon	2:11:53

== Personal bests ==
- 3000 metres - 7:41.87 min (1999/Japanese record)
- 5000 metres - 13:13.40 min (1998/Japanese record)
- 10,000 metres - 27:35.09 min (2001/Former Japanese record)
- Half marathon - 1:01:07 hrs (2003)
- Marathon - 2:06:16 hrs (2002/Former Asian record)
