= Sisay Bezabeh =

Australian athlete of Ethiopian descent

Personal information
- Nationality: Australian
- Born: 9 September 1977 (age 48) Asella, Oromia Region, Ethiopia
- Height: 1.71 m (5 ft 7 in)
- Weight: 55 kg (121 lb)

Sport
- Country: Australia
- Sport: Athletics
- Event(s): 10,000 meter run Marathon
Medal record
Men's athletics
Representing Ethiopia
World Cross Country Championships
Silver medal – second place	1996 Stellenbosch	U20 team

Sisay Bezabeh (born 9 September 1977 in Asella, Oromia Region, Ethiopia) is an Australian athlete of Ethiopian descent who specialized in the 10,000 metres and the marathon. He participated in the Olympic Games twice but did not place.

Representing Ethiopia, Bezabeh won a silver medal at the 1996 World Cross Country Championships, in the U20 team race. Bezabeh transferred his allegiance to Australia at the beginning of 1999.

Bezabeh came to Sydney, Australia to compete in the 1996 World Junior Championships in Athletics, but he stayed and was eventually accepted as a refugee due to civil war in his home country.

== Biography ==
At the 2000 Olympic Games in Sydney, Bezabeh participated in the 10,000 metres with a time of 28:21.63, he did not continue in the series.

Four years later, at the 2004 Olympic Games in Athens, he participated in the Olympic Marathon. He ran a time of 2:25.26, and came in 60th place.

His brother, Alemayehu Bezabeh, is currently a runner representing Spain.

== Personal records ==
Event	Performance	Date	Location
1500 m	3:49.99	1 January 2000	
5000 m	13:33.23	26 February 2000	Sydney
10,000 m	27:49.09	2 January 2002	Inglewood
Marathon	2:11.08	12 October 2003	Chicago

== Achievements ==
=== 10,000 m ===
- 2000: 11th in the Olympic series - 28:21.63

=== Marathon ===
- 2002: 9th 2002 Fukuoka Marathon - 2:16.34
- 2003: 9th 2003 Chicago Marathon - 2:11.08
- 2003: 16th 2003 London Marathon - 2:16.09
- 2004: 60th in the Olympic Games - 2:25.26
- 2005: 5th in the Beppu Oita Marathon - 2:13.14

=== Cross country running ===
- 2001: 73rd WK to Oostende (long distance) - 43.09
- 2002: 85th WK in Dublin (long distance) - 38.05
