= Marcio dos Santos =

Brazilian association football player

Personal information
- Full name: Marcio dos Santos Canhas
- Date of birth: 10 December 1973
- Place of birth: Brazil
- Date of death: 27 October 2002 (aged 28)
- Place of death: Huancayo, Peru
- Position: Forward

Senior career*
Years	Team	Apps	(Gls)
1998	Deportivo Pereira		
1999	Alianza Lima		
2000	Deportivo Pasto		
2001	Deportivo Wanka		
2002	Rangers (Talca)		
2002	Deportivo Wanka		
- * Club domestic league appearances and goals

Marcio dos Santos Canhas (10 December 1973 – 27 October 2002) was a Brazilian footballer who is last known to have played as a forward for Deportivo Wanka.

== Career ==
In 1998, dos Santos signed for Colombian side Deportivo Pereira. In 1999, he signed for Alianza Lima in Peru. In 2000, he signed for Colombian club Deportivo Pasto. In 2001, dos Santos signed for Deportivo Wanka in Peru. In 2002, he signed for Chilean team Rangers (Talca). After that, he returned to Deportivo Wanka in Peru. On 27 October 2002, dos Santos died due to a cardiac arrest after scoring during a 3-1 win over Alianza Lima.
