= Alexander Kuhn =

Russian Orientalist (1840–1888)

- Александр Кун
- Born: Alexander Ludvigovich Kuhn; 1840
- Died: 21 October 1888 (aged 47–48)
- Education: St. Petersburg Imperial University

Alexander Kuhn (Russian: Александр Кун; 1840–1888) was a Russian orientalist of German descent.

In 1860, Kuhn started studying Oriental Studies at St. Petersburg Imperial University.

Kuhn died on 21 October 1888.
