= Marko Hhawu =

Tanzanian long-distance runner

Personal information
- Nationality: Tanzanian
- Born: 3 September 1978 (age 47)

Sport
- Sport: Long-distance running
- Event: 10,000 metres

Marko Hhawu (born 3 September 1978) is a Tanzanian long-distance runner. He competed in the men's 10,000 metres at the 1996 Summer Olympics.
