= Zsolt Bácskai =

Hungarian long-distance runner

Personal information
- Nationality: Hungarian
- Born: 8 April 1975 (age 51)

Sport
- Sport: Long-distance running
- Event: Marathon

Zsolt Bácskai (born 8 April 1975) is a Hungarian long-distance runner. He competed in the men's marathon at the 2004 Summer Olympics.
