= Sebastiano Mazzara =

Italian long-distance runner

Personal information
- Full name: Giovanni Mazzara
- Nationality: Italian
- Born: 13 May 1975 (age 51)

Sport
- Country: Italy
- Sport: Athletics
- Event: Long-distance running

Achievements and titles
- Personal best: Half marathon: 1:05:16 (1999)

Sebastiano Mazzara (born 13 May 1975) is a former Italian male long-distance runner who competed at two editions of the IAAF World Cross Country Championships at senior level (1996, 1999), and one of the IAAF World Half Marathon Championships (1999).
