= 1994 IAAF World Cross Country Championships – Senior men's race =

Senior men's race at the 1994 IAAF World Cross Country Championships
- Organisers: IAAF
- Edition: 22nd
- Date: March 26
- Host city: Budapest, Hungary
- Venue: Kincsem Park
- Events: 1
- Distances: 12.06 km – Senior men
- Participation: 281 athletes from 57 nations

The Senior men's race at the 1994 IAAF World Cross Country Championships was held in Budapest, Hungary, at the Kincsem Park on March 26, 1994. A preview on the event was given in the Herald, and a report in The New York Times.

Complete results, medallists, and the results of British athletes were published.

== Race results ==
=== Senior men's race (12.06 km) ===
==== Individual ====
Rank	Athlete	Country	Time
1st place, gold medalist(s)	William Sigei	Kenya	34:29
2nd place, silver medalist(s)	Simon Chemoiywo	Kenya	34:30
3rd place, bronze medalist(s)	Haile Gebrselassie	Ethiopia	34:32
4	Paul Tergat	Kenya	34:36
5	Khalid Skah	Morocco	34:59
6	James Songok	Kenya	35:02
7	Addis Abebe	Ethiopia	35:11
8	Ayele Mezegebu	Ethiopia	35:14
9	Shem Kororia	Kenya	35:15
10	Mathias Ntawulikura	Rwanda	35:19
11	Salah Hissou	Morocco	35:23
12	Dominic Kirui	Kenya	35:26
13	Paulo Guerra	Portugal	35:27
14	Elarbi Khattabi	Morocco	35:34
15	Khaled Boulami	Morocco	35:39
16	Mohamed Issangar	Morocco	35:40
17	Wilson Omwoyo	Kenya	35:41
18	Mustapha Essaïd	France	35:41
19	Pere Arco	Spain	35:42
20	Vincenzo Modica	Italy	35:42
21	Martín Fiz	Spain	35:43
22	Brahim Lahlafi	Morocco	35:43
23	José Manuel García	Spain	35:44
24	Domingos Castro	Portugal	35:48
25	Yahia Azaidj	Algeria	35:56
26	Brahim Boutayeb	Morocco	35:57
27	Carlos de la Torre	Spain	35:58
28	Róbert Štefko	Slovakia	35:58
29	Julian Paynter	Australia	35:59
30	William Kiptum	Kenya	35:59
31	Hammou Boutayeb	Morocco	35:59
32	John Nuttall	United Kingdom	36:00
33	Alberto Maravilha	Portugal	36:00
34	Antonio Martins	France	36:01
35	Ibrahim Seid	Ethiopia	36:01
36	Ruddy Walem	Belgium	36:02
37	Tegenu Abebe	Ethiopia	36:05
38	Antonio Serrano	Spain	36:07
39	Thierry Pantel	France	36:08
40	Umberto Pusterla	Italy	36:09
41	Tendai Chimusasa	Zimbabwe	36:10
42	Fernando Couto	Portugal	36:11
43	Lemi Erpassa	Ethiopia	36:11
44	Owen MacHelm	South Africa	36:12
45	Brighton Chipere	Zimbabwe	36:12
46	Henrique Crisostomo	Portugal	36:13
47	Francisco Guerra	Spain	36:13
48	Joseph Kariuki	Kenya	36:14
49	Bertrand Frechard	France	36:18
50	Marcel Versteeg	Netherlands	36:20
51	Francesco Panetta	Italy	36:20
52	Stefano Baldini	Italy	36:21
53	Sergey Fedotov	Russia	36:22
54	João Junqueira	Portugal	36:23
55	Dave Clarke	United Kingdom	36:24
56	Imre Berkovics	Hungary	36:26
57	Yuriy Chizhov	Russia	36:27
58	Andrea Erni	Switzerland	36:27
59	Arnold Mächler	Switzerland	36:28
60	Tetiani Moyo	Zimbabwe	36:28
61	Oleg Strizhakov	Russia	36:28
62	Artur Castro	Brazil	36:32
63	Vanderlei de Lima	Brazil	36:32
64	Martin Jones	United Kingdom	36:33
65	Alejandro Gómez	Spain	36:33
66	Antonio Pérez	Spain	36:35
67	Aloys Nyandwi	Rwanda	36:36
68	Adalberto Garcia	Brazil	36:38
69	Mourad Bouldjadj	Algeria	36:41
70	Arthur Osman	Poland	36:42
71	José Carlos Adán	Spain	36:43
72	Dominic Bannister	United Kingdom	36:44
73	Benjamín Paredes	Mexico	36:44
74	Salvatore Bettiol	Italy	36:45
75	Meshack Mogotsi	South Africa	36:46
76	Yann Millon	France	36:48
77	Musa Gwanzura	Zimbabwe	36:48
78	Markku Hildén	Finland	36:49
79	Renato Gotti	Italy	36:49
80	Azzedine Sediki	Morocco	36:50
81	Michal Kucera	Czech Republic	36:50
82	Aleksandr Mikitenko	Kazakhstan	36:50
83	Yuichi Tajiri	Japan	36:51
84	Mikhail Dasko	Russia	36:52
85	Jillo Dube	Ethiopia	36:52
86	Miroslav Vanko	Slovakia	36:53
87	Abundio Mondragon	Mexico	36:53
88	Khristo Stefanov	Bulgaria	36:53
89	Markus Graf	Switzerland	36:53
90	Wayne Larden	Australia	36:54
91	Paul Patrick	Australia	36:54
92	Seamus Power	Ireland	36:54
93	Stephen Phofi	South Africa	36:55
94	Melese Feissa	Ethiopia	36:55
95	Shadrack Hoff	South Africa	36:55
96	Eamonn Martin	United Kingdom	36:56
97	Assefa Debele	Ethiopia	36:56
98	Vladimir Afanasyev	Russia	36:56
99	Timothy Gargiulo	United States	36:57
100	Rafael Muñoz	Mexico	36:58
101	Gennadiy Panin	Russia	36:59
102	Keith Dowling	United States	36:59
103	Piotr Gładki	Poland	37:00
104	Daniel Ferreira	Brazil	37:02
105	Craig Dickson	United States	37:02
106	François Barreau	France	37:02
107	Delmir dos Santos	Brazil	37:03
108	Jeff Schiebler	Canada	37:05
109	Jan Mokhalo	South Africa	37:05
110	Hans Ulin	Belgium	37:06
111	José Santos	Portugal	37:06
112	Krzysztof Baldyga	Poland	37:06
113	Winston Muzini	Zimbabwe	37:07
114	Antonio Ibañez	Argentina	37:07
115	Ion Avramescu	Romania	37:09
116	Oscar Amaya	Argentina	37:10
117	Jim Westphal	United States	37:11
118	Farid Khayrullin	Russia	37:11
119	Jonathan Hume	United States	37:13
120	Mohamed Ezzher	France	37:14
121	Andrey Kuznetsov	Russia	37:14
122	Mark Coogan	United States	37:15
123	Tayeb Kalloud	Algeria	37:15
124	Isaac Opperman	South Africa	37:16
125	Barry Royden	United Kingdom	37:16
126	Valery Chesak	Ukraine	37:16
127	Martin Rodriguez Flores	Mexico	37:17
128	Viktor Rogovoy	Ukraine	37:19
129	Klaus-Peter Hansen	Denmark	37:20
130	Laban Nkete	South Africa	37:22
131	Leonardo Malgor	Argentina	37:23
132	Yoshikazu Aizawa	Japan	37:23
133	Darren Mead	United Kingdom	37:24
134	Kamel Zegaar	Algeria	37:26
135	Vladimir Tsyamchik	Belarus	37:27
136	Toshinori Tachizako	Japan	37:27
137	Ferenc Sági	Hungary	37:29
138	Paolo Donati	Italy	37:29
139	Luc Krotwaar	Netherlands	37:30
140	Bruno Le Stum	France	37:30
141	Simon Modise	South Africa	37:31
142	Tomix da Costa	Brazil	37:31
143	Marco Gielen	Netherlands	37:32
144	Pasi Mattila	Finland	37:32
145	Silvio Guerra	Ecuador	37:33
146	Brad Barquist	United States	37:33
147	Steve Tunstall	United Kingdom	37:33
148	Doug Cronkite	Canada	37:33
149	Hideyuki Suzuki	Japan	37:34
150	Goran Raičević	Yugoslavia	37:34
151	Masafurai Nakano	Japan	37:35
152	Rod de Highden	Australia	37:35
153	Paul McCloy	Canada	37:35
154	Marcelo Cascabelo	Argentina	37:35
155	Dmitriy Kapitonov	Russia	37:37
156	Dov Kremer	Israel	37:37
157	Belkheir Sayah	Algeria	37:38
158	Andrey Zhulin	Kazakhstan	37:39
159	Mahieddine Belhadj	Algeria	37:41
160	Marcel Laros	Netherlands	37:41
161	Eduardo do Nascimento	Brazil	37:42
162	Peter Matthews	Ireland	37:44
163	Mohamed Belabbès	Algeria	37:46
164	Santos Ortega	Mexico	37:47
165	Fritz Awoseb	Namibia	37:47
166	Jamie Lewis	Ireland	37:48
167	Daniel Castro	Argentina	37:48
168	Norihiko Oda	Japan	37:48
169	Fraser Bertram	Canada	37:49
170	Tarek Zoghmar	Algeria	37:49
171	Greg van Hest	Netherlands	37:49
172	Roberto Alonso	Mexico	37:50
173	Bruno Heuberger	Switzerland	37:51
174	Vladimir Gusev	Kazakhstan	37:51
175	John Andrews	Australia	37:52
176	Péter Jager	Hungary	37:52
177	Andrey Gladishev	Ukraine	37:52
178	Izudin Hrapic	Slovenia	37:54
179	Stane Rozman	Slovenia	37:55
180	Vladimir Kiselyov	Kyrgyzstan	37:57
181	Walter Durbano	Italy	38:02
182	Rodney Higgins	Australia	38:03
183	István Pintér	Hungary	38:04
184	Florin Ionescu	Romania	38:05
185	Bahadur Prasad	India	38:06
186	Petros Dzadagu	Zimbabwe	38:08
187	Raishimane Kikina	Botswana	38:09
188	Ray Boyd	Australia	38:10
189	Juan Juárez	Argentina	38:10
190	Oleg Saveliey	Belarus	38:11
191	Grigoriy Nikolayenya	Belarus	38:12
192	Modise Mosarwa	Botswana	38:13
193	Tibor Molnár	Hungary	38:14
194	Jan Pesava	Czech Republic	38:15
195	Ion Danou	Moldova	38:15
196	Pasi Jeremejeff	Finland	38:16
197	Marius Hasler	Switzerland	38:16
198	Yoichiro Kan	Japan	38:17
199	Kasimir Kunz	Switzerland	38:18
200	Miroslav Vindis	Slovenia	38:18
201	Mikhail Berezin	Belarus	38:18
202	Zoltán Kadlót	Hungary	38:21
203	Sugar Singh	India	38:22
204	Aleksey Tarasyuk	Belarus	38:23
205	Timo-Pekka Kalermo	Finland	38:23
206	Cheikh Boye	Senegal	38:24
207	Rens Eising	Netherlands	38:25
208	Luis Reyes	Mexico	38:26
209	John Scherer	United States	38:27
210	József Kovács	Hungary	38:27
211	Patrick Rama	South Africa	38:28
212	Santtu Mäkinen	Finland	38:29
213	Jeff Campbell	United States	38:29
214	Sasa Ljubojevic	Croatia	38:30
215	Noel Richardson	Ireland	38:31
216	Thierry Constantin	Switzerland	38:35
217	Allan Klassen	Canada	38:36
218	Gerry Healy	Ireland	38:36
219	Roman Kejzar	Slovenia	38:37
220	Jean-Francois Cünnet	Switzerland	38:39
221	Pauric McKinney	Ireland	38:41
222	Yuri Pushko	Belarus	38:43
223	Vitaly Melcayev	Ukraine	38:44
224	Philip Rist	Switzerland	38:45
225	Sergey Polikarpov	Kazakhstan	38:46
226	Madan Singh	India	38:48
227	Anatoliy Bychaev	Kazakhstan	38:52
228	Muzaffer Cintimar	Turkey	38:54
229	Tiyapo Maso	Botswana	38:58
230	Aleksandr Kuzin	Ukraine	38:59
231	Marijan Krempl	Slovenia	39:02
232	Amit Ne'eman	Israel	39:06
233	Joseph Kibur	Canada	39:07
234	Antal Szücs	Hungary	39:07
235	Sbaa Smati	Algeria	39:08
236	Mehmet Günen	Turkey	39:10
237	William Roldán	Colombia	39:11
238	Rein Valdmaa	Estonia	39:15
239	Arkadiy Nikitin	Kyrgyzstan	39:17
240	Nazirdin Akylbekov	Kyrgyzstan	39:18
241	Geza Grabar	Slovenia	39:18
242	Krishnan Shankar	India	39:19
243	Mansukh Singh	India	39:20
244	Muslim Shansharbekov	Kazakhstan	39:26
245	Patrick Ndayisenga	Burundi	39:27
246	Marly Sopyev	Turkmenistan	39:29
247	Kailash Mane	India	39:30
248	Leonid Pykhteyev	Kyrgyzstan	39:37
249	Bonnie Gare	Botswana	40:08
250	Sukru Onat	Turkey	40:09
251	Jakob Kodric	Slovenia	40:14
252	Mike Felicite	Mauritius	40:21
253	Denis O'Mahony	Ireland	40:24
254	Patrick Moonsamy	Mauritius	40:25
255	Lesedinyana Lekgoa	Botswana	40:28
256	Mohamed Al-Hada	Yemen	40:38
257	Gerben Ypelaar	Netherlands	40:51
258	Fouad Obad	Yemen	40:57
259	Janik Lambert	Canada	41:13
260	Igor Surla	Ukraine	41:30
261	Lee Kar-Lun	Hong Kong	41:56
262	Zachariah Ditetso	Botswana	42:03
263	Christopher Blackburn	Mauritius	42:27
264	Sergey Kamayev	Turkmenistan	42:35
265	Tofik Inger	Turkmenistan	43:47
266	Makudi Mubenga	Zaire	44:31
267	Gairat Nigmatov	Tajikistan	44:46
—	Abdellah Béhar	France	DNF
—	Andy Bristow	United Kingdom	DNF
—	Ezequiel Canario	Portugal	DNF
—	Shaun Creighton	Australia	DNF
—	Luis Jesús	Portugal	DNF
—	Clodoaldo do Carmo	Brazil	DNF
—	Antonio Silio	Argentina	DNF
—	Andrea Arlati	Italy	DNF
—	Jari Venäläinen	Finland	DNF
—	Khalid Al-Hajjar	Palestine	DNF
—	Nasser Al-Zahama	Palestine	DNF
—	Tamal Mahmood	Palestine	DNF
—	Mohamed Tubaila	Palestine	DNF
—	Mutaz Saidum	Palestine	DNF

==== Teams ====
Rank	Team	Points
1st place, gold medalist(s)	Kenya: William Sigei / 1; Simon Chemoiywo / 2; Paul Tergat / 4; James Songok / 6; Shem Kororia / 9; Dominic Kirui / 12; (Wilson Omwoyo) / (17); (William Kiptum) / (30); (Joseph Kariuki) / (48)	34
2nd place, silver medalist(s)	Morocco: Khalid Skah / 5; Salah Hissou / 11; Elarbi Khattabi / 14; Khaled Boulami / 15; Mohamed Issangar / 16; Brahim Lahlafi / 22; (Brahim Boutayeb) / (26); (Hammou Boutayeb) / (31); (Azzedine Sediki) / (80)	83
3rd place, bronze medalist(s)	Ethiopia: Haile Gebrselassie / 3; Addis Abebe / 7; Ayele Mezegebu / 8; Ibrahim Seid / 35; Tegenu Abebe / 37; Lemi Erpassa / 43; (Jillo Dube) / (85); (Melese Feissa) / (94); (Assefa Debele) / (97)	133
4	Spain: Pere Arco / 19; Martín Fiz / 21; José Manuel García / 23; Carlos de la Torre / 27; Antonio Serrano / 38; Francisco Guerra / 47; (Alejandro Gómez) / (65); (Antonio Pérez) / (66); (José Carlos Adán) / (71)	175
5	Portugal: Paulo Guerra / 13; Domingos Castro / 24; Alberto Maravilha / 33; Fernando Couto / 42; Henrique Crisostomo / 46; João Junqueira / 54; (José Santos) / (111); (Ezequiel Canario) / (DNF); (Luis Jesús) / (DNF)	212
6	Italy: Vincenzo Modica / 20; Umberto Pusterla / 40; Francesco Panetta / 51; Stefano Baldini / 52; Salvatore Bettiol / 74; Renato Gotti / 79; (Paolo Donati) / (138); (Walter Durbano) / (181); (Andrea Arlati) / (DNF)	316
7	France: Mustapha Essaïd / 18; Antonio Martins / 34; Thierry Pantel / 39; Bertrand Frechard / 49; Yann Millon / 76; François Barreau / 106; (Mohamed Ezzher) / (120); (Bruno Le Stum) / (140); (Abdellah Béhar) / (DNF)	322
8	United Kingdom: John Nuttall / 32; Dave Clarke / 55; Martin Jones / 64; Dominic Bannister / 72; Eamonn Martin / 96; Barry Royden / 125; (Darren Mead) / (133); (Steve Tunstall) / (147); (Andy Bristow) / (DNF)	444
9	Russia: Sergey Fedotov / 53; Yuriy Chizhov / 57; Oleg Strizhakov / 61; Mikhail Dasko / 84; Vladimir Afanasyev / 98; Gennadiy Panin / 101; (Farid Khayrullin) / (118); (Andrey Kuznetsov) / (121); (Dmitriy Kapitonov) / (155)	454
10	Zimbabwe: Tendai Chimusasa / 41; Brighton Chipere / 45; Tetiani Moyo / 60; Musa Gwanzura / 77; Winston Muzini / 113; Petros Dzadagu / 186	522
11	South Africa: Owen MacHelm / 44; Meshack Mogotsi / 75; Stephen Phofi / 93; Shadrack Hoff / 95; Jan Mokhalo / 109; Isaac Opperman / 124; (Laban Nkete) / (130); (Simon Modise) / (141); (Patrick Rama) / (211)	540
12	Brazil: Artur Castro / 62; Vanderlei de Lima / 63; Adalberto Garcia / 68; Daniel Ferreira / 104; Delmir dos Santos / 107; Tomix da Costa / 142; (Eduardo do Nascimento) / (161); (Clodoaldo do Carmo) / (DNF)	546
13	United States: Timothy Gargiulo / 99; Keith Dowling / 102; Craig Dickson / 105; Jim Westphal / 117; Jonathan Hume / 119; Mark Coogan / 122; (Brad Barquist) / (146); (John Scherer) / (209); (Jeff Campbell) / (213)	664
14	Algeria: Yahia Azaidj / 25; Mourad Bouldjadj / 69; Tayeb Kalloud / 123; Kamel Zegaar / 134; Belkheir Sayah / 157; Mahieddine Belhadj / 159; (Mohamed Belabbès) / (163); (Tarek Zoghmar) / (170); (Sbaa Smati) / (235)	667
15	Australia: Julian Paynter / 29; Wayne Larden / 90; Paul Patrick / 91; Rod de Highden / 152; John Andrews / 175; Rodney Higgins / 182; (Ray Boyd) / (188); (Shaun Creighton) / (DNF)	719
16	Mexico: Benjamín Paredes / 73; Abundio Mondragon / 87; Rafael Muñoz / 100; Martin Rodriguez Flores / 127; Santos Ortega / 164; Roberto Alonso / 172; (Luis Reyes) / (208)	723
17	Switzerland: Andrea Erni / 58; Arnold Mächler / 59; Markus Graf / 89; Bruno Heuberger / 173; Marius Hasler / 197; Kasimir Kunz / 199; (Thierry Constantin) / (216); (Jean-Francois Cünnet) / (220); (Philip Rist) / (224)	775
18	Japan: Yuichi Tajiri / 83; Yoshikazu Aizawa / 132; Toshinori Tachizako / 136; Hideyuki Suzuki / 149; Masafurai Nakano / 151; Norihiko Oda / 168; (Yoichiro Kan) / (198)	819
19	Netherlands: Marcel Versteeg / 50; Luc Krotwaar / 139; Marco Gielen / 143; Marcel Laros / 160; Greg van Hest / 171; Rens Eising / 207; (Gerben Ypelaar) / (257)	870
20	Argentina: Antonio Ibañez / 114; Oscar Amaya / 116; Leonardo Malgor / 131; Marcelo Cascabelo / 154; Daniel Castro / 167; Juan Juárez / 189; (Antonio Silio) / (DNF)	871
21	Hungary: Imre Berkovics / 56; Ferenc Sági / 137; Péter Jager / 176; István Pintér / 183; Tibor Molnár / 193; Zoltán Kadlót / 202; (József Kovács) / (210); (Antal Szücs) / (234)	947
22	Canada: Jeff Schiebler / 108; Doug Cronkite / 148; Paul McCloy / 153; Fraser Bertram / 169; Allan Klassen / 217; Joseph Kibur / 233; (Janik Lambert) / (259)	1028
23	Ireland: Seamus Power / 92; Peter Matthews / 162; Jamie Lewis / 166; Noel Richardson / 215; Gerry Healy / 218; Pauric McKinney / 221; (Denis O'Mahony) / (253)	1074
24	Kazakhstan: Aleksandr Mikitenko / 82; Andre Zhulin / 158; Vladimir Gusev / 174; Sergey Polikarpov / 225; Anatoliy Bychaev / 227; Muslim Shansharbekov / 244	1110
25	Belarus: Vladimir Tsyamchik / 135; Oleg Saveliey / 190; Grigoriy Nikolayenya / 191; Mikhail Berezin / 201; Aleksey Tarasyuk / 204; Yuri Pushko / 222	1143
26	Ukraine: Valery Chesak / 126; Viktor Rogovoy / 128; Andrey Gladishev / 177; Vitaly Melcayev / 223; Aleksandr Kuzin / 230; Igor Surla / 260	1144
27	Slovenia: Izudin Hrapic / 178; Stane Rozman / 179; Miroslav Vindis / 200; Roman Kejzar / 219; Marijan Krempl / 231; Geza Grabar / 241; (Jakob Kodric) / (251)	1248
28	India: Bahadur Prasad / 185; Sugar Singh / 203; Madan Singh / 226; Krishnan Shankar / 242; Mansukh Singh / 243; Kailash Mane / 247	1346
29	Botswana: Raishimane Kikina / 187; Modise Mosarwa / 192; Tiyapo Maso / 229; Bonnie Gare / 249; Lesedinyana Lekgoa / 255; Zachariah Ditetso / 262	1374
DNF	Finland: (Markku Hildén) / (78); (Pasi Mattila) / (144); (Pasi Jeremejeff) / (196); (Timo-Pekka Kalermo) / (205); (Santtu Mäkinen) / (212); (Jari Venäläinen) / (DNF)	DNF

- Note: Athletes in parentheses did not score for the team result

== Participation ==
An unofficial count yields the participation of 281 athletes from 57 countries in the Senior men's race. This is in agreement with the official numbers as published.

- Algeria (9)
- Argentina (7)
- Australia (8)
- Belarus (6)
- Belgium (2)
- Botswana (6)
- Brazil (8)
- Bulgaria (1)
- Burundi (1)
- Canada (7)
- Colombia (1)
- Croatia (1)
- Czech Republic (2)
- Denmark (1)
- Ecuador (1)
- Estonia (1)
- Ethiopia (9)
- Finland (6)
- France (9)
- Hong Kong (1)
- Hungary (8)
- India (6)
- Ireland (7)
- Israel (2)
- Italy (9)
- Japan (7)
- Kazakhstan (6)
- Kenya (9)
- Kyrgyzstan (4)
- Mauritius (3)
- Mexico (7)
- Moldova (1)
- Morocco (9)
- Namibia (1)
- Netherlands (7)
- Palestine (5)
- Poland (3)
- Portugal (9)
- Romania (2)
- Russia (9)
- Rwanda (2)
- Senegal (1)
- Slovakia (2)
- Slovenia (7)
- South Africa (9)
- Spain (9)
- Switzerland (9)
- Tajikistan (1)
- Turkey (3)
- Turkmenistan (3)
- Ukraine (6)
- United Kingdom (9)
- United States (9)
- Yemen (2)
- Yugoslavia (1)
- Zaire (1)
- Zimbabwe (6)

== See also ==
- 1994 IAAF World Cross Country Championships – Junior men's race
- 1994 IAAF World Cross Country Championships – Senior women's race
- 1994 IAAF World Cross Country Championships – Junior women's race
