= 1994 IAAF World Cross Country Championships – Junior women's race =

Junior women's race at the 1994 IAAF World Cross Country Championships
- Organisers: IAAF
- Edition: 22nd
- Date: March 26
- Host city: Budapest, Hungary
- Venue: Kincsem Park
- Events: 1
- Distances: 4.3 km – Junior women
- Participation: 142 athletes from 39 nations

The Junior women's race at the 1994 IAAF World Cross Country Championships was held in Budapest, Hungary, at the Kincsem Park on March 26, 1994. A preview on the event was given in the Herald, and a report in The New York Times.

Complete results, medallists, and the results of British athletes were published.

== Race results ==
=== Junior women's race (4.3 km) ===
==== Individual ====
Rank	Athlete	Country	Time
1st place, gold medalist(s)	Sally Barsosio	Kenya	14:04
2nd place, silver medalist(s)	Rose Cheruiyot	Kenya	14:05
3rd place, bronze medalist(s)	Elizabeth Cheptanui	Kenya	14:15
4	Gabriela Szabo	Romania	14:25
5	Ruth Biwott	Kenya	14:27
6	Naomi Mugo	Kenya	14:29
7	Pamela Chepchumba	Kenya	14:36
8	Azumi Miyazaki	Japan	14:37
9	Shura Hotesa	Ethiopia	14:46
10	Birhan Dagne	Ethiopia	14:48
11	Nicola Slater	United Kingdom	14:49
12	Susie Power	Australia	14:49
13	Abeba Tola	Ethiopia	14:50
14	Leila Aman	Ethiopia	14:51
15	Miwa Sugawara	Japan	14:55
16	Etaferahu Tarekegn	Ethiopia	15:00
17	Mary Jane Richards	Canada	15:05
18	Kanako Haginaga	Japan	15:07
19	Sachiko Yokotsuka	Japan	15:09
20	Olivera Jevtić	Yugoslavia	15:12
21	Denisa Costescu	Romania	15:15
22	Chipo Dzikiti	Zimbabwe	15:16
23	Ileana Dorca	Romania	15:17
24	Chiemi Takahashi	Japan	15:21
25	Natalie Harvey	Australia	15:23
26	Heidi Moulder	United Kingdom	15:24
27	Lauren Hunter	South Africa	15:24
28	Philomène Uyambalé	Rwanda	15:26
29	Letiwe Marakurwa	Zimbabwe	15:27
30	Karina Szymanska	Poland	15:28
31	Rie Ueno	Japan	15:30
32	Svetlana Berdysheva	Russia	15:32
33	Evelina Nell	South Africa	15:32
34	Marta Domínguez	Spain	15:34
35	Maria Sangeorzan	Romania	15:34
36	Oksana Zhelezniak	Russia	15:35
37	Verena Karstens	Germany	15:38
38	Yekaterina Bogatyreva	Russia	15:39
39	Esther Heinold	Germany	15:40
40	Catherine Berry	United Kingdom	15:41
41	Romana Sanigova	Czech Republic	15:41
42	Claire O'Connor	United Kingdom	15:42
43	Szilvia Csoszánszky	Hungary	15:42
44	Julia Stamps	United States	15:44
45	Sandrine Host	Belgium	15:44
46	Elena Tital	Romania	15:44
47	Lubica Sedlaková	Slovakia	15:45
48	Paula Hernandez	Spain	15:45
49	Irina Skiba	Ukraine	15:46
50	Sarah Simmons	United Kingdom	15:47
51	Katalin Szentgyörgyi	Hungary	15:48
52	Nadezhda Ilyina	Russia	15:49
53	Maribel Sanchez	United States	15:50
54	Maria Elena Calle	Ecuador	15:53
55	Margarita Circujanu	Spain	15:54
56	Jolanda Steblovnik	Slovenia	15:54
57	Yelena Tolstygina	Belarus	15:55
58	Leandri Botes	South Africa	15:55
59	Vanda Ribeiro	Portugal	15:56
60	Laura Flores	Mexico	15:56
61	Irina Nedelenko	Ukraine	15:57
62	Angie Froese	Canada	15:58
63	Silvia Montane	Spain	15:58
64	Natallia Kvachuk	Belarus	15:59
65	Chan Man-Yee	Hong Kong	15:59
66	Anikó Kálovics	Hungary	15:59
67	Nadezhda Zolotaryova	Russia	16:00
68	Claudia Burca	Romania	16:00
69	Godirilemang Olerile	Botswana	16:02
70	Magali Carne	France	16:02
71	Saskia Jeck	Germany	16:03
72	Beata Kazimierczyk	Poland	16:03
73	Malika El Ali	France	16:03
74	Celine Rajot	France	16:04
75	Vivian Pott	Australia	16:04
76	Katrin Engelen	Germany	16:04
77	Karen Bockel	Germany	16:05
78	Michelle Matthews	United Kingdom	16:05
79	Mirja Moser	Switzerland	16:06
80	Tatyana Protasenko	Belarus	16:06
81	Oxsana Ishchuk	Ukraine	16:07
82	Renata Borzecka	Poland	16:07
83	Caroline Smets	Belgium	16:08
84	Rosa Berardo	Italy	16:09
85	Katarzyna Somkowska	Poland	16:10
86	Angie Graham	Canada	16:10
87	Wioletta Frankiewicz	Poland	16:10
88	Karina Moncayo	Ecuador	16:11
89	S. Linthombi	India	16:11
90	Erin St.John	United States	16:12
91	Ausilia Balletta	Italy	16:14
92	Whitney Spannuth	United States	16:14
93	Fabiane Cristine da Silva	Brazil	16:15
94	Mpho Mabuza	South Africa	16:15
95	Patricia Holmen	Canada	16:16
96	Tuelo Setswamorago	Botswana	16:17
97	Oxana Avseyenko	Kazakhstan	16:17
98	Angelika Torma	Hungary	16:18
99	N. Radhamani	India	16:19
100	Lyudmila Grisko	Ukraine	16:23
101	Elisa Preo	Italy	16:23
102	Christine Nichols	United States	16:24
103	Elvira Longo	Spain	16:24
104	Natalya Polikarpova	Russia	16:24
105	Clair Fearnley	Australia	16:28
106	Moira Scasitelli	Italy	16:28
107	Monica Gaspari	Italy	16:30
108	Jitka Belohlavková	Czech Republic	16:30
109	Miriam Achote	Ecuador	16:31
110	Nikolett Pásztor	Hungary	16:32
111	Sarah Speleers	Belgium	16:33
112	Asha Rani	India	16:34
113	Yeshi Gebreselassie	Ethiopia	16:35
114	Olga Pivovarova	Kazakhstan	16:35
115	Christina Amice	France	16:36
116	Cerian Shepherd	Canada	16:36
117	Candida McCarthy	United States	16:37
118	Oksana Molchanova	Belarus	16:42
119	Virginie Fouquet	France	16:42
120	Kamila Neubauerová	Czech Republic	16:43
121	Anjolie Wisse	Netherlands	16:43
122	Stephanie Guichonnet	France	16:43
123	Goabamang Ramasimo	Botswana	16:45
124	Maisa Tcharyeva	Turkmenistan	16:46
125	Sonja Deckers	Belgium	16:47
126	Zuzana Sariková	Slovakia	16:47
127	Renata Kvitova	Czech Republic	16:47
128	Vivian de Aguiar	Brazil	16:49
129	Ogomoditse Gabajesame	Botswana	16:50
130	Maria Vele	Ecuador	16:52
131	Mayra Caiza	Ecuador	16:52
132	Sarolta Koltavári	Hungary	16:53
133	Marzia Albanesi	Italy	17:01
134	Jerelene Stols	South Africa	17:05
135	Tatyana Borisova	Kyrgyzstan	17:24
136	Guylsara Dadabayeva	Tajikistan	17:45
137	Adriana Lopes	Brazil	17:56
138	Adenisia da Silva	Brazil	18:07
—	Rocío Martínez	Spain	DNF
—	Stephanie van Graan	South Africa	DNF
—	Joginder Kaur	India	DNF
—	Delia Al-Hajjar	Palestine	DNF

==== Teams ====
Rank	Team	Points
1st place, gold medalist(s)	Kenya: Sally Barsosio / 1; Rose Cheruiyot / 2; Elizabeth Cheptanui / 3; Ruth Biwott / 5; (Naomi Mugo) / (6); (Pamela Chepchumba) / (7)	11
2nd place, silver medalist(s)	Ethiopia: Shura Hotesa / 9; Birhan Dagne / 10; Abeba Tola / 13; Leila Aman / 14; (Etaferahu Tarekegn) / (16); (Yeshi Gebreselassie) / (113)	46
3rd place, bronze medalist(s)	Japan: Azumi Miyazaki / 8; Miwa Sugawara / 15; Kanako Haginaga / 18; Sachiko Yokotsuka / 19; (Chiemi Takahashi) / (24); (Rie Ueno) / (31)	60
4	Romania: Gabriela Szabo / 4; Denisa Costescu / 21; Ileana Dorca / 23; Maria Sangeorzan / 35; (Elena Tital) / (46); (Claudia Burca) / (68)	83
5	United Kingdom: Nicola Slater / 11; Heidi Moulder / 26; Catherine Berry / 40; Claire O'Connor / 42; (Sarah Simmons) / (50); (Michelle Matthews) / (78)	119
6	Russia: Svetlana Berdysheva / 32; Oksana Zhelezniak / 36; Yekaterina Bogatyreva / 38; Nadezhda Ilyina / 52; (Nadezhda Zolotaryova) / (67); (Natalya Polikarpova) / (104)	158
7	Spain: Marta Domínguez / 34; Paula Hernandez / 48; Margarita Circujanu / 55; Silvia Montane / 63; (Elvira Longo) / (103); (Rocío Martínez) / (DNF)	200
8	South Africa: Lauren Hunter / 27; Evelina Nell / 33; Leandri Botes / 58; Mpho Mabuza / 94; (Jerelene Stols) / (134); (Stephanie van Graan) / (DNF)	212
9	Australia: Susie Power / 12; Natalie Harvey / 25; Vivian Pott / 75; Clair Fearnley / 105	217
10	Germany: Verena Karstens / 37; Esther Heinold / 39; Saskia Jeck / 71; Katrin Engelen / 76; (Karen Bockel) / (77)	223
11	Hungary: Szilvia Csoszánszky / 43; Katalin Szentgyörgyi / 51; Anikó Kálovics / 66; Angelika Torma / 98; (Nikolett Pásztor) / (110); (Sarolta Koltavári) / (132)	258
12	Canada: Mary Jane Richards / 17; Angie Froese / 62; Angie Graham / 86; Patricia Holmen / 95; (Cerian Shepherd) / (116)	260
13	Poland: Karina Szymanska / 30; Beata Kazimierczyk / 72; Renata Borzecka / 82; Katarzyna Somkowska / 85; (Wioletta Frankiewicz) / (87)	269
14	United States: Julia Stamps / 44; Maribel Sanchez / 53; Erin St.John / 90; Whitney Spannuth / 92; (Christine Nichols) / (102); (Candida McCarthy) / (117)	279
15	Ukraine: Irina Skiba / 49; Irina Nedelenko / 61; Oxsana Ishchuk / 81; Lyudmila Grisko / 100	291
16	Belarus: Yelena Tolstygina / 57; Natallia Kvachuk / 64; Tatyana Protasenko / 80; Oksana Molchanova / 118	319
17	France: Magali Carne / 70; Malika El Ali / 73; Celine Rajot / 74; Christina Amice / 115; (Virginie Fouquet) / (119); (Stephanie Guichonnet) / (122)	332
18	Belgium: Sandrine Host / 45; Caroline Smets / 83; Sarah Speleers / 111; Sonja Deckers / 125	364
19	Ecuador: Maria Elena Calle / 54; Karina Moncayo / 88; Miriam Achote / 109; Maria Vele / 130; (Mayra Caiza) / (131)	381
20	Italy: Rosa Berardo / 84; Ausilia Balletta / 91; Elisa Preo / 101; Moira Scasitelli / 106; (Monica Gaspari) / (107); (Marzia Albanesi) / (133)	382
21	Czech Republic: Romana Sanigova / 41; Jitka Belohlavková / 108; Kamila Neubauerová / 120; Renata Kvitova / 127	396
22	Botswana: Godirilemang Olerile / 69; Tuelo Setswamorago / 96; Goabamang Ramasimo / 123; Ogomoditse Gabajesame / 129	417
23	Brazil: Fabiane Cristine da Silva / 93; Vivian de Aguiar / 128; Adriana Lopes / 137; Adenisia da Silva / 138	496
DNF	India: (S. Linthombi) / (89); (N. Radhamani) / (99); (Asha Rani) / (112); (Joginder Kaur) / (DNF)	DNF

- Note: Athletes in parentheses did not score for the team result

== Participation ==
An unofficial count yields the participation of 142 athletes from 39 countries in the Junior women's race. This is in agreement with the official numbers as published.

- Australia (4)
- Belarus (4)
- Belgium (4)
- Botswana (4)
- Brazil (4)
- Canada (5)
- Czech Republic (4)
- Ecuador (5)
- Ethiopia (6)
- France (6)
- Germany (5)
- Hong Kong (1)
- Hungary (6)
- India (4)
- Italy (6)
- Japan (6)
- Kazakhstan (2)
- Kenya (6)
- Kyrgyzstan (1)
- Mexico (1)
- Netherlands (1)
- Palestine (1)
- Poland (5)
- Portugal (1)
- Romania (6)
- Russia (6)
- Rwanda (1)
- Slovakia (2)
- Slovenia (1)
- South Africa (6)
- Spain (6)
- Switzerland (1)
- Tajikistan (1)
- Turkmenistan (1)
- Ukraine (4)
- United Kingdom (6)
- United States (6)
- Yugoslavia (1)
- Zimbabwe (2)

== See also ==
- 1994 IAAF World Cross Country Championships – Senior men's race
- 1994 IAAF World Cross Country Championships – Junior men's race
- 1994 IAAF World Cross Country Championships – Senior women's race
