= African Half Marathon Championships =

- Sport: Half marathon running
- Founded: 1995
- Continent: Africa (CAA)

The African Half Marathon Championships was a biennial half marathon running competition between athletes from Africa. A short-lived event, it was held on three occasions from its inauguration in 1995 to its dissolution in 1999.

The event contained both individual and nation team race elements. The creation of the competition followed on from the launch of a discrete African Marathon Championships in 1994. Abidjan – the host of the first marathon championships – staged the half marathon event the year after as a men's only race. The second tournament saw the introduction of women's races and was held in Djibouti in 1997. The final races were held in Jijel, Algeria, in 1999.

South Africa's Ezael Thlobo became the first ever African half marathon champion. He was succeeded to the men's title by Ethiopia's Ayele Mezgebu and Kamel Kohil of Algeria was the final men's champion – his time of 1:04:38 was the fastest recorded at the tournament by a margin of 50 seconds. On the women's side, an Ethiopian, Meseret Kotu, became the first African women's half marathon champion and her winning time of 1:17:09 was never bettered. Nasria Azaïdj was the second and last champion.

It was the second discrete continental half marathon championships to be launched, after the South American Half Marathon Championships which also debuted in 1995. These two continental events were spurred by the creation of the IAAF World Half Marathon Championships two years earlier. After the African competition was abandoned, a new African-level half marathon was established as a result of the event's inclusion on the programme of the 2007 All-Africa Games, replacing the longer marathon.

== Medallists ==
=== Men ===
Event	Gold		Silver		Bronze	
1995	Ezael Thlobo (RSA)	1:06:00	Willy Kalombo Mwenze (ZAI)	1:06:36	Nixon Nkodima (RSA)	1:06:43
1997	Ayele Mezgebu (ETH)	1:06:18	Berhanu Addane (ETH)	1:06:21	Tesfaye Tola (ETH)	1:06:38
1999	Kamel Kohil (ALG)	1:04:38	Maxwell Zungu (RSA)	1:05:28	Ahmed Boulahia (ALG)	1:05:34

=== Women ===
Year	Gold		Silver		Bronze	
1995	Not held					
1997	Meseret Kotu (ETH)	1:17:09	Leila Aman (ETH)	1:17:48	Abeba Tola (ETH)	1:21:44
1999	Nasria Azaïdj (ALG)	1:20:12	Sonia Agoun (TUN)	1:20:42	Fatiha Hanika (ALG)	1:25:40
