= 1994 IAAF World Cross Country Championships =

Championships held in Budapest, Hungary

- Organisers: IAAF
- Edition: 22nd
- Date: March 26
- Host city: Budapest, Hungary
- Venue: Kincsem Park
- Events: 4
- Distances: 12.06 km – Senior men 8.14 km – Junior men 6.22 km – Senior women 4.3 km – Junior women
- Participation: 760 athletes from 60 nations

The 1994 IAAF World Cross Country Championships was held in Budapest, Hungary, at the Kincsem Park on March 26, 1994. A preview on the event was given in the Herald, and a report in The New York Times.

Complete results for senior men, junior men, senior women, junior women, medallists, and the results of British athletes were published.

== Medallists ==
Event	Gold		Silver		Bronze	
Individual
Senior men (12.06 km)	William Sigei; Kenya	34:29	Simon Chemoiywo; Kenya	34:30	Haile Gebrselassie; Ethiopia	34:32
Junior men (8.14 km)	Philip Mosima; Kenya	24:15	Daniel Komen; Kenya	24:17	Abreham Tsige; Ethiopia	24:46
Senior women (6.22 km)	Hellen Chepngeno; Kenya	20:45	Catherina McKiernan; Ireland	20:52	Conceição Ferreira; Portugal	20:52
Junior women (4.3 km)	Sally Barsosio; Kenya	14:04	Rose Cheruiyot; Kenya	14:05	Elizabeth Cheptanui; Kenya	14:15
Team
Senior men	Kenya	34	Morocco	83	Ethiopia	133
Junior men	Kenya	18	Ethiopia	27	Morocco	78
Senior women	Portugal	55	Ethiopia	65	Kenya	75
Junior women	Kenya	11	Ethiopia	46	Japan	60

== Race results ==
=== Senior men's race (12.06 km) ===
Individual race
Rank	Athlete	Country	Time
1st place, gold medalist(s)	William Sigei	Kenya	34:29
2nd place, silver medalist(s)	Simon Chemoiywo	Kenya	34:30
3rd place, bronze medalist(s)	Haile Gebrselassie	Ethiopia	34:32
4	Paul Tergat	Kenya	34:36
5	Khalid Skah	Morocco	34:56
6	James Songok	Kenya	35:02
7	Addis Abebe	Ethiopia	35:11
8	Ayele Mezegebu	Ethiopia	35:14
9	Shem Kororia	Kenya	35:15
10	Mathias Ntawulikura	Rwanda	35:19
11	Salah Hissou	Morocco	35:23
12	Dominic Kirui	Kenya	35:26
Full results

Teams
Rank	Team	Points
1st place, gold medalist(s)	Kenya: William Sigei / 1; Simon Chemoiywo / 2; Paul Tergat / 4; James Songok / 6; Shem Kororia / 9; Dominic Kirui / 12; (Wilson Omwoyo) / (17); (William Kiptum) / (30); (Joseph Kariuki) / (48)	34
2nd place, silver medalist(s)	Morocco: Khalid Skah / 5; Salah Hissou / 11; Elarbi Khattabi / 14; Khaled Boulami / 15; Mohamed Issangar / 16; Brahim Lahlafi / 22; (Brahim Boutayeb) / (26); (Hammou Boutayeb) / (31); (Azzedine Sediki) / (80)	83
3rd place, bronze medalist(s)	Ethiopia: Haile Gebrselassie / 3; Addis Abebe / 7; Ayele Mezegebu / 8; Ibrahim Seid / 35; Tegenu Abebe / 37; Lemi Erpassa / 43; (Jillo Dube) / (85); (Melese Feissa) / (94); (Assefa Debele) / (97)	133
4	Spain	175
5	Portugal	212
6	Italy	316
7	France	322
8	United Kingdom	444
Full results

- Note: Athletes in parentheses did not score for the team result

=== Junior men's race (8.14 km) ===
Individual race
Rank	Athlete	Country	Time
1st place, gold medalist(s)	Philip Mosima	Kenya	24:15
2nd place, silver medalist(s)	Daniel Komen	Kenya	24:17
3rd place, bronze medalist(s)	Abreham Tsige	Ethiopia	24:46
4	Philip Kemei	Kenya	24:49
5	Lemma Alemayehu	Ethiopia	25:00
6	Pablo Olmedo	Mexico	25:04
7	Tibebu Reta	Ethiopia	25:04
8	Reyes Estévez	Spain	25:11
9	Meck Mothuli	South Africa	25:13
10	Salah El Ghazi	Morocco	25:15
11	David Kiptum	Kenya	25:16
12	Tekalegne Shewaye	Ethiopia	25:20
Full results

Teams
Rank	Team	Points
1st place, gold medalist(s)	Kenya: Philip Mosima / 1; Daniel Komen / 2; Philip Kemei / 4; David Kiptum / 11; (John Bungei) / (19); (Wilson Musto) / (81)	18
2nd place, silver medalist(s)	Ethiopia: Abreham Tsige / 3; Lemma Alemayehu / 5; Tibebu Reta / 7; Tekalegne Shewaye / 12; (Tolosa Gebre) / (13); (Fikadu Bekele) / (22)	27
3rd place, bronze medalist(s)	Morocco: Salah El Ghazi / 10; Abdelmajid El Boubkary / 18; Mohamed El Hattab / 20; Abdelilah El Marrafe / 30; (Mohamed Ahansal) / (35); (Mohamed Amyn) / (48)	78
4	South Africa	96
5	Japan	118
6	Mexico	152
7	Spain	159
8	Italy	175
Full results

- Note: Athletes in parentheses did not score for the team result

=== Senior women's race (6.22 km) ===
Individual race
Rank	Athlete	Country	Time
1st place, gold medalist(s)	Hellen Chepngeno	Kenya	20:45
2nd place, silver medalist(s)	Catherina McKiernan	Ireland	20:52
3rd place, bronze medalist(s)	Conceição Ferreira	Portugal	20:52
4	Merima Denboba	Ethiopia	20:57
5	Albertina Dias	Portugal	20:59
6	Elana Meyer	South Africa	21:00
7	Zola Pieterse	South Africa	21:01
8	Farida Fatès	France	21:01
9	Olga Shurbanova	Russia	21:05
10	Fernanda Ribeiro	Portugal	21:05
11	Margareta Keszeg	Romania	21:06
12	Daria Nauer	Switzerland	21:10
Full results

Teams
Rank	Team	Points
1st place, gold medalist(s)	Portugal: Conceição Ferreira / 3; Albertina Dias / 5; Fernanda Ribeiro / 10; Mónica Gama / 37; (Carla Sacramento) / (73); (Ana Oliveira) / (85)	55
2nd place, silver medalist(s)	Ethiopia: Merima Denboba / 4; Getenesh Urge / 14; Asha Gigi / 19; Berhane Adere / 28; (Gete Wami) / (34); (Mama Amele) / (96)	65
3rd place, bronze medalist(s)	Kenya: Hellen Chepngeno / 1; Joyce Chepchumba / 18; Jane Omoro / 25; Hellen Kimaiyo / 31; (Pacifica Monda) / (36); (Leah Malot) / (81)	75
4	Russia	84
5	Spain	111
6	South Africa	124
7	Italy	127
8	Japan	134
Full results

- Note: Athletes in parentheses did not score for the team result

=== Junior women's race (4.3 km) ===
Individual race
Rank	Athlete	Country	Time
1st place, gold medalist(s)	Sally Barsosio	Kenya	14:04
2nd place, silver medalist(s)	Rose Cheruiyot	Kenya	14:05
3rd place, bronze medalist(s)	Elizabeth Cheptanui	Kenya	14:15
4	Gabriela Szabo	Romania	14:25
5	Ruth Biwott	Kenya	14:27
6	Naomi Mugo	Kenya	14:29
7	Pamela Chepchumba	Kenya	14:36
8	Azumi Miyazaki	Japan	14:37
9	Shura Hotesa	Ethiopia	14:46
10	Birhan Dagne	Ethiopia	14:48
11	Nicola Slater	United Kingdom	14:49
12	Susie Power	Australia	14:49
Full results

Teams
Rank	Team	Points
1st place, gold medalist(s)	Kenya: Sally Barsosio / 1; Rose Cheruiyot / 2; Elizabeth Cheptanui / 3; Ruth Biwott / 5; (Naomi Mugo) / (6); (Pamela Chepchumba) / (7)	11
2nd place, silver medalist(s)	Ethiopia: Shura Hotesa / 9; Birhan Dagne / 10; Abeba Tola / 13; Leila Aman / 14; (Etaferahu Tarekegn) / (16); (Yeshi Gebreselassie) / (113)	46
3rd place, bronze medalist(s)	Japan: Azumi Miyazaki / 8; Miwa Sugawara / 15; Kanako Haginaga / 18; Sachiko Yokotsuka / 19; (Chiemi Takahashi) / (24); (Rie Ueno) / (31)	60
4	Romania	83
5	United Kingdom	119
6	Russia	158
7	Spain	200
8	South Africa	212
Full results

- Note: Athletes in parentheses did not score for the team result

== Medal table (unofficial) ==
Rank	Nation	Gold	Silver	Bronze	Total
1	Kenya	7	3	2	12
2	Portugal	1	0	1	2
3	Ethiopia	0	3	3	6
4	Morocco	0	1	1	2
5	Ireland	0	1	0	1
6	Japan	0	0	1	1
Totals (6 entries)		8	8	8	24

- Note: Totals include both individual and team medals, with medals in the team competition counting as one medal.

== Participation ==
An unofficial count yields the participation of 760 athletes from 60 countries. This is in agreement with the official numbers as published.

- Algeria (15)
- Argentina (15)
- Australia (21)
- Belarus (18)
- Belgium (11)
- Botswana (10)
- Brazil (21)
- Bulgaria (1)
- Burundi (1)
- Canada (22)
- China (4)
- Colombia (2)
- Croatia (4)
- Czech Republic (11)
- Denmark (7)
- Ecuador (7)
- Estonia (3)
- Ethiopia (27)
- Finland (7)
- France (27)
- Germany (10)
- Hong Kong (2)
- Hungary (26)
- India (18)
- Ireland (13)
- Israel (3)
- Italy (27)
- Japan (25)
- Kazakhstan (16)
- Kenya (27)
- Kyrgyzstan (6)
- Mauritius (7)
- Mexico (19)
- Moldova (3)
- Morocco (21)
- Namibia (1)
- Netherlands (14)
- Palestine (7)
- Poland (16)
- Portugal (21)
- Romania (20)
- Russia (26)
- Rwanda (4)
- Senegal (1)
- Sierra Leone (1)
- Slovakia (7)
- Slovenia (10)
- South Africa (27)
- Spain (27)
- Switzerland (14)
- Tajikistan (2)
- Turkey (4)
- Turkmenistan (7)
- Ukraine (19)
- United Kingdom (27)
- United States (27)
- Yemen (7)
- Yugoslavia (3)
- Zaire (1)
- Zimbabwe (10)

== See also ==
- 1994 IAAF World Cross Country Championships – Senior men's race
- 1994 IAAF World Cross Country Championships – Junior men's race
- 1994 IAAF World Cross Country Championships – Senior women's race
- 1994 IAAF World Cross Country Championships – Junior women's race
- 1994 in athletics (track and field)
