= Simon Chemoiywo =

Kenyan long-distance runner

Medal record

Men's athletics

Representing Kenya

African Championships
Gold medal – first place	1993 Durban	5000 m
Silver medal – second place	1996 Yaoundé	5000 m

World Cross Country Championships
Silver medal – second place	1994 Budapest	Senior race
Gold medal – first place	1994 Budapest	Team race
Gold medal – first place	1995 Durham	Team race

Simon Chemoiywo (born 20 April 1968) is a Kenyan former long-distance runner. He competed in track, cross country and road running. At the IAAF World Cross Country Championships he twice represented Kenya: in 1994 he was the runner-up and team champion, then helped retain the team title for Kenya at the 1995 race.

He was the African champion in the 5000 metres in 1993 in a championship record and was a silver medallist at the same event three years later. He was a one-time Kenyan champion in the 5000 m, in 1994, and competed for Kenya in that event at the 1995 World Championships in Athletics. He holds personal bests of 13:07.57 minutes for the 5000 m and 27:25.82 minutes for the 10,000 metres.

In road events he was twice winner of both the Saint Silvester Road Race and Vancouver Sun Run. He made his marathon debut in 1998 and set his best of 2:10:35 hrs while winning the Prague Marathon.

== Career ==
Chemoiywo began to enter the elite senior ranks of distance running in the early 1990s: he ran a best of 13:18.95 minutes for the 5000 metres in 1992, which placed him near the top 30 for the discipline that year. He won over that distance at the Palio Citta della Quercia that same year. He began to prove himself in cross country running after the end of that track season, winning the Cross Du Figaro in December and the Antrim International Cross Country the following January. He had similar achievements on the roads at the same time: crossing the Atlantic, he won the Sallie Mae 10K in the United States and came out on top at the high level Saint Silvester Road Race.

He established himself among the top international runners with a win over 5000 m in Durban at the 1993 African Championships in Athletics, beating Haile Gebrselassie who went on to become world champion later that year. His winning time of 13:09.68 minutes was a championship record, and also the fastest time ever run for the distance in South Africa. He returned to the roads in South America at the end of the year, retaining his title at the Saint Silvester race and also winning at the Corrida San Fernando 10K.

Chemoiywo gained his first international selection on grass for the 1994 IAAF World Cross Country Championships. At the race in Budapest he led with teammate William Sigei and narrowly finished as runner-up, one second behind. He beat Haile Gebrselassie once again, as the Ethiopian was third. Chemoiywo shared the team gold medal with Sigei as well as his individual silver medal. On the track he set a 5000 m personal best of 13:07.58 minutes at the London Grand Prix (placing third), was seventh at the Bislett Games, then improved his best by one hundredth to win at the Herculis meet. This ranked him in the top ten runners for the distance that year. He was entered into the 1994 IAAF Grand Prix Final but managed only eleventh place. That year he had his first and only career victory at the Kenyan Athletics Championships, winning the 5000 m.

The 1995 IAAF World Cross Country Championships brought him a consecutive team gold medal with Kenya, although he was lower ranked in the individual race, ending in eighth place. Turning to the track, he ran a 10,000 metres best of 27:25.82 minutes to win at the Sea Ray Relays and rank in the top ten for the discipline that season. While in the United States, he also won the Times Colonist Garden City 10K in a course record of 28:47 minutes. Another personal best came at the Grande Premio Brasil Caixa de Atletismo, where he won the 3000 metres in a meet record of 7:43.15 minutes. A run of 13:16.38 minutes for fourth at the Athletissima was enough to secure selection for Kenya at the 1995 World Championships in Athletics. He was the worst performing of the Kenyan 5000 m team as he failed to progress beyond the heats while Ismael Kirui won the title and Shem Kororia took bronze.

The highlight of the 1996 season for Chemoiywo was a silver medal in the 5000 m at the 1996 African Championships in Athletics. He failed to defend his title by the smallest of margins, losing to fellow Kenyan Paul Koech with both registering the same time of 13:35.13 minutes. On the European circuit that year he set three career bests: 5:04.9 minutes for the 2000 metres, 7:42.40 minutes for the 3000 m and 8:28.91 minutes for the two miles.

In the late 1990s he focused on road running events. His debut over the marathon distance came at the end of the 1998 season, when he ran at the New York City Marathon and placed seventh with a time of 2:11:08 hours. He had his second career win at the Vancouver Sun Run. He was the winner at the 2000 Prague Marathon, improving his personal best time to 2:10:35. This was his only marathon win. In his last competitive year his marathon performances declined, as he was twelfth at the Prague Marathon and seventh at the Honolulu Marathon in December with slow time of 2:24:57 hours.

He was enrolled with the Kenyan Air Force during his late running career.

== Personal bests ==
- 2000 metres – 5:04.9 min (1996)
- 3000 metres – 7:42.40 min (1996)
- Two miles – 8:28.91 min (1996)
- 5000 metres – 13:07.57 min (1994)
- 10,000 metres – 27:25.82 min (1995)
- 10K run – 28:15 min (1998)
- Marathon – 2:10:35 hrs (2000)

== National titles ==
- Kenyan Athletics Championships
  - 5000 metres: 1994

== International competitions ==
Year	Competition	Venue	Position	Event	Notes
1993	African Championships	Durban, South Africa	1st	5000 metres	13:09.68 CR
1994	World Cross Country Championships	Budapest, Hungary	2nd	Senior race	
1994	World Cross Country Championships	Budapest, Hungary	1st	Team race	
1994	IAAF Grand Prix Final	Paris, France	11th	5000 metres	13:58.32
1995	World Cross Country Championships	Durham, United Kingdom	8th	Senior race	
1995	World Cross Country Championships	Durham, United Kingdom	1st	Team race	
1995	World Championships	Gothenburg, Sweden	7th (heats)	5000 metres	13:39.04
1996	African Championships	Yaoundé, Cameroon	2nd	5000 metres	13:35.13

== See also ==
- List of champions of the African Athletics Championships
