= 1992 World Junior Championships in Athletics – Men's 10,000 metres =

The men's 10,000 metres event at the 1992 World Junior Championships in Athletics was held in Seoul, South Korea, at Olympic Stadium on 18 September. Josephat Machuka finished second, but as he was being passed just before the finish, he deliberately punched at the eventual winner Haile Gebrselassie during the final sprint and was disqualified.

== Medalists ==
| Gold | Haile Gebrselassie; Ethiopia |
| Silver | Josephat Ndeti; Kenya |
| Bronze | Yasuyuki Watanabe; Japan |

== Results ==
=== Final ===
18 September

| Rank | Name | Nationality | Time | Notes |
|---|---|---|---|---|
| 1st place, gold medalist(s) | Haile Gebrselassie | Ethiopia | 28:03.99 | |
| 2nd place, silver medalist(s) | Josephat Ndeti | Kenya | 28:46.25 | |
| 3rd place, bronze medalist(s) | Yasuyuki Watanabe | Japan | 28:52.89 | |
| 4 | Tegenu Abebe | Ethiopia | 29:29.97 | |
| 5 | Oscar Cortínez | Argentina | 29:31.80 | |
| 6 | Nestor Cevasco | Argentina | 29:32.84 | |
| 7 | Eliseo Martín | Spain | 29:38.13 | |
| 8 | Elias Bastos | Brazil | 29:39.99 | |
| 9 | Bruno Toledo | Spain | 29:52.28 | |
| 10 | Antonio Andriani | Italy | 29:59.18 | |
| 11 | Maurizio Leone | Italy | 30:01.85 | |
| 12 | Kim Min-Woo | South Korea | 30:02.55 | |
| 13 | José Alejandro Semprún | Venezuela | 30:02.85 | |
| 14 | Juma Ninga | Tanzania | 30:03.58 | |
| 15 | Jo Yeong-Do | South Korea | 30:41.81 | |
| 16 | Marcos Villa | Mexico | 30:43.34 | |
| 17 | Cláudio da Silva | Brazil | 30:50.03 | |
| 18 | Jorge Chávez | Peru | 31:20.73 | |
| 19 | Yahya Dogan | Turkey | 31:38.13 | |
| 20 | Muzaffer Çintimar | Turkey | 31:39.82 | |
| 21 | Stelios Marneros | Cyprus | 32:11.55 | |
| | Josephat Machuka | Kenya | DQ | |
| | Michael Lola | Tanzania | DNF | |

== Participation ==
According to an unofficial count, 23 athletes from 14 countries participated in the event.

- Argentina (2)
- Brazil (2)
- Cyprus (1)
- Ethiopia (2)
- Italy (2)
- Japan (1)
- Kenya (2)
- Mexico (1)
- Peru (1)
- South Korea (2)
- Spain (2)
- Tanzania (2)
- Turkey (2)
- Venezuela (1)
