= Jimmy Muindi =

Kenyan long-distance runner

Jimmy Mwangangi Muindi (born August 14, 1973) is a marathon runner from Kenya.

== Overview ==
Muindi started his marathon career by finishing 2nd at the Honolulu Marathon in 1997. Subsequently, he has remained a consistent participant in the Honolulu Marathon, achieving an unprecedented victory six times (1999, 2000, 2003, 2004, 2005, 2007). Notably, he established the course record of 2:11:12 hours in 2004, a record that remained unbroken until 2008.

He won the Rotterdam Marathon in 2005 setting his personal record of 2:07:50 hours. He also competed at the 2005 World Championships marathon race in Helsinki, Finland, but did not finish the race.

At the Chicago Marathon, Mundi finished 5th in 2003, 4th in 2004 and 3rd in 2006. At the Berlin Marathon, he finished 10th in 2001 and 5th in 2002.

Muindi is of the Kamba people. Muindi's sister Marietta is married to Patrick Ivuti, also a prominent Kenyan marathon runner.

== Achievements ==
Year	Competition	Venue	Position	Event	Notes
Representing Kenya
1992	World Junior Championships	Seoul, South Korea	1st	3000m steeplechase	8:31.62
1999	Honolulu Marathon	Honolulu, Hawaii	1st	Marathon	2:16:45
2000	Honolulu Marathon	Honolulu, Hawaii	1st	Marathon	2:15:19
2002	Berlin Marathon	Berlin, Germany	5th	Marathon	2:08:25
2003	Honolulu Marathon	Honolulu, Hawaii	1st	Marathon	2:12:59
2004	Honolulu Marathon	Honolulu, Hawaii	1st	Marathon	2:11:12
2005	Rotterdam Marathon	Rotterdam, Netherlands	1st	Marathon	2:07:50
2005	Honolulu Marathon	Honolulu, Hawaii	1st	Marathon	2:12:00
2007	Honolulu Marathon	Honolulu, Hawaii	1st	Marathon	2:18:53
