= Saïd Chébili =

French middle-distance runner

Personal information
- Born: 6 May 1973 (age 52) Tizi Ouzou, Algeria

Sport
- Sport: Athletics
- Event: 1500 metres

Saïd Chébili (born 6 May 1973) is a French former middle-distance runner who competed primarily in the 1500 metres. He represented his country at two outdoor and one indoor World Championships.

== International competitions ==
Year	Competition	Venue	Position	Event	Notes
Representing France
1997	World Indoor Championships	Paris, France	11th	3000 m	7:58.57
1997	World Championships	Athens, Greece	20th (sf)	1500 m	3:41.95
2001	World Championships	Edmonton, Canada	23rd (sf)	1500 m	3:43.58
2002	European Indoor Championships	Vienna, Austria	7th	1500 m	3:51.00

== Personal bests ==
Outdoor

- 800 metres – 1:49.29 (Aix-les-Bains 1999)
- 1000 metres – 2:20.76 (Nancy 1997)
- 1500 metres – 3:33.66 (St. Denis 1999)
- One mile – 3:52.21 (Nice 1997)
- 2000 metres – 4:57.39 (Villeneuve d'Ascq 1997)
- 3000 metres – 7:57.71 (Villeneuve d'Ascq 1996)

Indoor

- 1500 metres – 3:37.76 (Stuttgart 2001)
- One mile – 3:58.34 (Liévin 2000)
- 2000 metres – 5:00.88 (Budapest 1999)
- 3000 metres – 7:47.65 (Karlsruhe 2000)
