= 1992 World Junior Championships in Athletics – Men's 3000 metres steeplechase =

The men's 3000 metres steeplechase event at the 1992 World Junior Championships in Athletics was held in Seoul, South Korea, at Olympic Stadium on 18 and 20 September.

== Medalists ==
Gold	Jimmy Muindi; Kenya
Silver	Ayele Mezegebu; Ethiopia
Bronze	Stephen Chepseba; Kenya

== Results ==
=== Final ===
20 September

Rank	Name	Nationality	Time	Notes
1st place, gold medalist(s)	Jimmy Muindi	Kenya	8:31.62	
2nd place, silver medalist(s)	Ayele Mezegebu	Ethiopia	8:32.43	
3rd place, bronze medalist(s)	Stephen Chepseba	Kenya	8:32.48	
4	Steffen Brandis	Germany	8:39.58	
5	Glenn Stojanovic	Australia	8:40.62	
6	Emerson Vettori	Brazil	8:41.55	
7	Takeshi Yamamoto	Japan	8:41.73	
8	Yoshiyuki Ikeda	Japan	8:42.52	
9	André Green	Germany	8:43.61	
10	Marco Rebelo	Portugal	8:49.04	
11	Antony Mwingereza	Tanzania	8:54.97	
12	Stuart Kefford	United Kingdom	8:59.42	

=== Heats ===
18 September

==== Heat 1 ====
Rank	Name	Nationality	Time	Notes
1	Ayele Mezegebu	Ethiopia	8:38.77	Q
2	Stephen Chepseba	Kenya	8:38.82	Q
3	Yoshiyuki Ikeda	Japan	8:41.91	Q
4	André Green	Germany	8:45.46	Q
5	Marco Rebelo	Portugal	8:50.10	q
6	Nathan Kennedy	United States	8:54.62	
7	Stefano Ciallella	Italy	8:55.74	
8	José María González	Spain	9:00.29	
9	Dainius Saucikovas	Lithuania	9:01.51	
10	Adam Dobrzynski	Poland	9:05.24	
11	Hasan Yilmaz	Turkey	9:11.85	
12	Jaciel Silva	Brazil	9:20.73	
13	Jeff Schiebler	Canada	9:40.42	

==== Heat 2 ====
Rank	Name	Nationality	Time	Notes
1	Jimmy Muindi	Kenya	8:42.27	Q
2	Emerson Vettori	Brazil	8:46.00	Q
3	Steffen Brandis	Germany	8:47.13	Q
4	Glenn Stojanovic	Australia	8:48.01	Q
5	Antony Mwingereza	Tanzania	8:48.82	q
6	Takeshi Yamamoto	Japan	8:53.78	q
7	Stuart Kefford	United Kingdom	8:54.15	q
8	Ferdinando Vicari	Italy	8:54.75	
9	Clement Hagima	Romania	9:09.08	
10	Abderrahmane Daas	Algeria	9:10.77	
11	Paulo Gomes	Portugal	9:14.22	
12	Grzegorz Pustulka	Poland	9:27.59	
13	Petar Kajtazi	Croatia	9:37.59	

== Participation ==
According to an unofficial count, 26 athletes from 19 countries participated in the event.

- Algeria (1)
- Australia (1)
- Brazil (2)
- Canada (1)
- Croatia (1)
- Ethiopia (1)
- Germany (2)
- Italy (2)
- Japan (2)
- Kenya (2)
- Lithuania (1)
- Poland (2)
- Portugal (2)
- Romania (1)
- Spain (1)
- Tanzania (1)
- Turkey (1)
- United Kingdom (1)
- United States (1)
