= Haile Resorts =

Ethiopian hotel chain

- ሃይሌ ሪዞርትስ
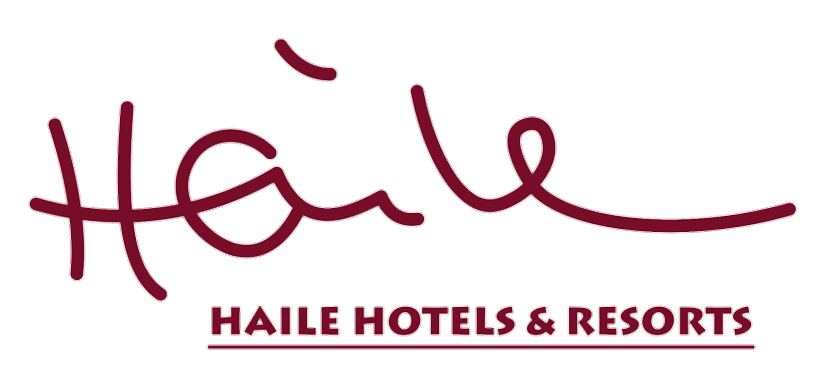

General information
- Location: Bole Road, Addis Ababa, Ethiopia, Hawassa, Ethiopia
- Coordinates: 7.079526°N 38.479091°E
- Inaugurated: 2010
- Demolished: 30 June 2020 (Haile Resorts Ziway and Shashemene)
- Renovation cost: ~300 million birr (according to Haile)
- Owner: Haile Gebrselassie (CEO)
- Landlord: Melkamu Mekonnen (Managing Director)

Design and construction
- Engineer: Lukas Chalto (Chief Engineer)

Website
- www.haileresorts.com

Haile Resorts (Amharic: ሃይሌ ሪዞርትስ) is a hotel chain in Ethiopia owned by renowned athlete Haile Gebrselassie. Founded in 2010 in Hawassa, the resort opened 3 branches in Shashamene, Ziway and Arba Minch. It then continued its expansion through Amhara Region, Addis Ababa South Ethiopia and Oromia Region.

During the Hachalu Hundessa riots on 30 June 2020, two hotels in Shashamene and Ziway were sacked and 400 staff were out of work. Haile's recent Resort branch was opened in Welkite town in the Southern Nations, Nationalities, and People's Region in 2022.

== History ==
=== 2010s ===
Athlete Haile Gebrselassie founded the resort in May 2010. It was based in Lake Hawassa, about 250 miles south of Addis Ababa. Since then, the company has opened 5 destination branches: Haile Hotel in Shashamene, Ziway Resort, Haile Arba Minch and Yaya Africa Athletics Village.

=== 2020s ===
On the day of protest after the murder of Hachalu Hundessa on 30 June 2020, Haile claimed that his two hotels in Shashamene and Ziway were destroyed during this unrest, and 400 staffs were out of work.

On 4 September 2020, Haile introduced the 7th Haile Resorts in Adama costing half billion birr. The new resort has 106 guest rooms, gymnasiums, swimming pools, dining and meeting halls. According to him, this resort has employed more than 300 people and would provide 4 to 5-star rating services.

In February 2022, Haile embarked 5,352 square meters eleven hotels in Welkite town, which were completed on 18 September 2022. In the opening ceremony, Haile and the president of the Southern Nations, Nationalities, and People's Region inaugurated the completion of the project. The construction cost more than half billion birr (~13,500,000 usd )promoting the company to complete plans as possible.

== List of resorts ==
- Haile Resorts Hawassa
- Haile Resorts Wolaita Sodo
- Haile Resorts Ziway
- Haile Resorts Sululta
- Haile Resorts Shashemene
- Haile Resorts Arba Minch
- Haile Resorts Gondar
- Haile Resorts Adama
- Haile Grand Hotel Addis Ababa
- Haile Resorts Debre Birhan
- Haile Resort Jimma
