= Martin Jones (runner) =

British mountain runner (born 1967)

Personal information
- Nationality: British (English)
- Born: 21 April 1967 (age 59) Lancashire, England

Sport
- Sport: Athletics
- Event: Long distance / Mountain running
- Club: Horwich AC
Medal record
Representing Great Britain
Event	1st	2nd	3rd
World Championships	2	0	0
Total	2	0	0

Martin John Jones (born 21 April 1967) is a British former mountain runner who won the 1992 (short distance) and 1993 World Mountain Running Championships.

== Biography ==
Jones was a member of Horwich AC and finished second behind Rob Denmark in the 10,000 metres event at the 1994 AAA Championships.

He also represented his country on other surfaces, competing in the World Cross Country Championships in 1994 and 1995 and running for England in the 10,000 metres on the track in the 1994 Commonwealth Games, where he finished in fourth place. He ran internationally in road races too, including the 1993 World Half Marathon Championships.
