= 1999 IAAF World Indoor Championships – Men's 3000 metres =

The men's 3000 metres event at the 1999 IAAF World Indoor Championships was held on March 5.

== Results ==
Rank	Name	Nationality	Time	Notes
1st place, gold medalist(s)	Haile Gebrselassie	Ethiopia	7:53.57	
2nd place, silver medalist(s)	Paul Bitok	Kenya	7:53.79	
3rd place, bronze medalist(s)	Million Wolde	Ethiopia	7:53.85	
4	Gennaro di Napoli	Italy	7:55.60	
5	Yousef El Nasri	Spain	7:56.70	
6	Steve Holman	United States	7:56.96	
7	Darren Lynch	Australia	7:58.12	
8	Marco Antonio Rufo	Spain	7:58.24	
9	Ali Saïdi-Sief	Algeria	8:02.20	
10	Brian Baker	United States	8:04.59	
11	Akira Kiniwa	Japan	8:04.95	NR
12	Réda Benzine	Algeria	8:07.89	
13	Yonas Kifle	Eritrea	8:34.41	
