= Marathon Motors Engineering =

Marathon Motors Engineering, Plc.
- Type: Private limited company
- Industry: Automotive industry
- Founded: 2009
- Headquarters: Addis Ababa, Ethiopia
- Key people: Melkamu Assefa (CEO); Haile Gebrselassie (Chairman)
- Products: Automobiles
- Website: marathonmotorengineering.com

The Marathon Motor Engineering, Plc. is a joint venture between South Korean automobile manufacturer Hyundai Motor Company and Ethiopian former long-distance runner Haile Gebrselassie. The company is located in Addis Ababa, Ethiopia, and was founded in 2009. The firm is the official general importer of Hyundai vehicles in Ethiopia.

For the first time, the company was presenting itself on the press conference of the Haile Resort presentation in Awasa. Currently, it cooperates with Hyundai running the erected automobile assembly plant in Nifas Silk-Lafto, Addis Ababa, which had been inaugurated in February 2019. As of July 2020, it already started assembling the electric Hyundai Ioniq.
