= Haile Gebrselassie =

Ethiopian long-distance runner and businessman (born 1973)

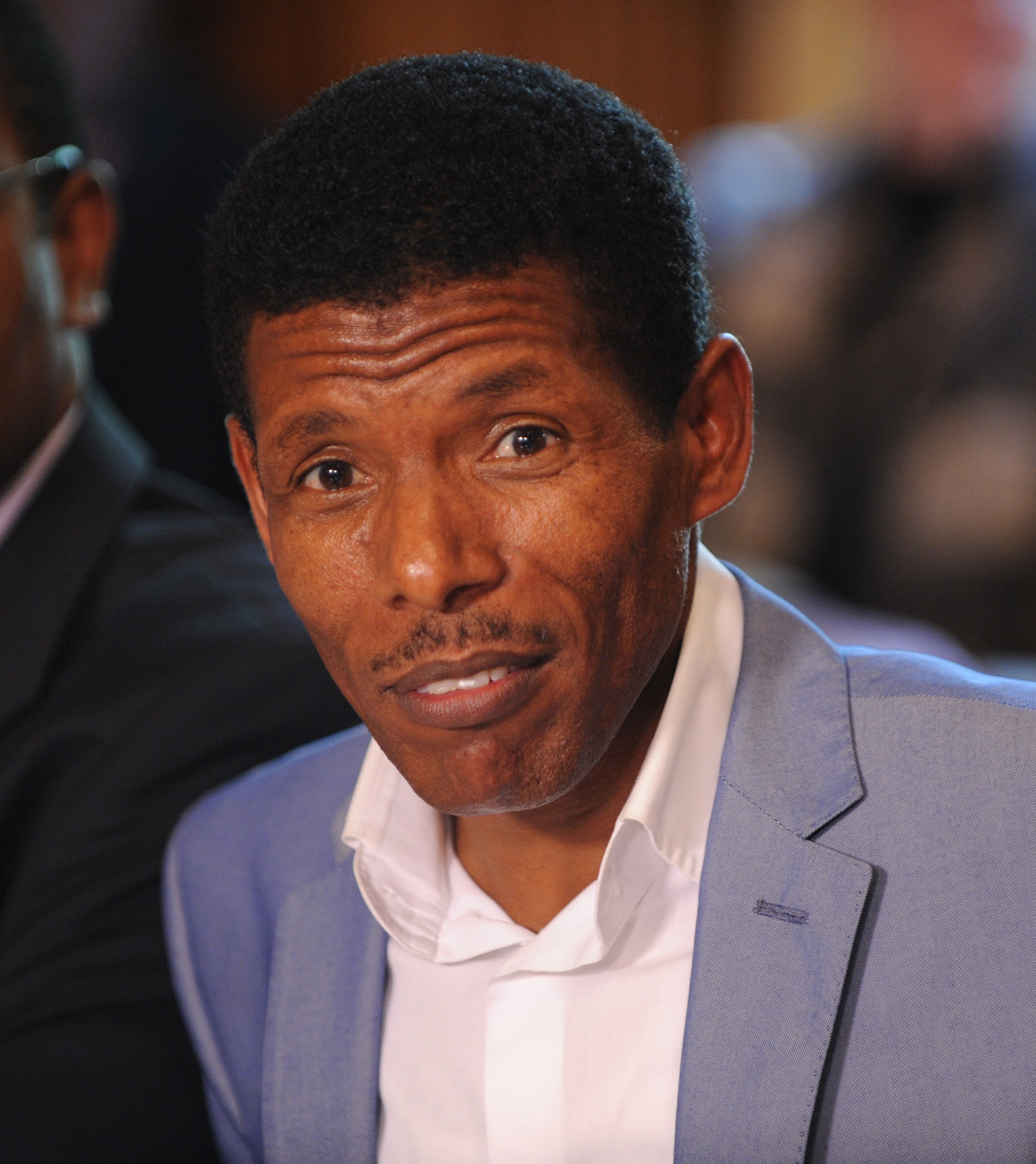
- Haile Gebrselassie in 2012

Personal information
- Full name: Haile Gebrselassie
- Citizenship: Ethiopian
- Born: 18 April 1973 (age 53) Asella, Arsi Province, Ethiopian Empire
- Height: 1.65 m (5 ft 5 in)
- Weight: 56 kg (123 lb)
- Spouse: Alem Gebrselassie (m. 1996)
- Children: 3, Edet, Melat, and Batiy

Sport
- Country: Ethiopia
- Sport: Athletics/Track, Long-distance running
- Events: 10,000 metres, 5000 metres, 3000 metres, 1500 metres, Half marathon, Marathon
- Club: Adidas
- Retired: May 2015

Achievements and titles
- Olympic finals: 1996 Atlanta; 10,000 m, Gold; 2000 Sydney; 10,000 m, Gold; 2004 Athens; 10,000 m, 5th; 2008 Beijing; 10,000 m, 6th
- World finals: 1993 Stuttgart; 5000 m, Silver; 10,000 m, Gold; 1995 Gothenburg; 10,000 m, Gold; 1997 Athens; 10,000 m, Gold; 1999 Seville; 10,000 m, Gold; 2001 Edmonton; 10,000 m, Bronze; 2003 Paris; 10,000 m, Silver
- Personal bests: 1500 m: 3:33.73 (Stuttgart 1999); Mile: 3:52.39 (Gateshead 1999); 3000 m: 7:25.09 (Brussels 1998); 2 miles: 8:01.08 NBP (Hengelo 1997); 5000 m: 12:39.36 (Helsinki 1998); 10,000 m: 26:22.75 (Hengelo 1998); Indoors; 800 m: 1:49.35i (Dortmund 1997); 1500 m: 3:31.76i (Stuttgart 1998); 2000 m: 4:52.86i (Birmingham 1998); 3000 m: 7:26.15i (Karlsruhe 1998); 2 miles: 8:04.69i (Birmingham 2003); 5000 m: 12:50.38i (Birmingham 1999); Road; 10 km: 27:02 (Doha 2002); 10 miles: 44:24 (Tilburg 2005); Half marathon: 58:55 (Tempe 2006); Marathon: 2:03:59 (Berlin 2008)
Medal record
Representing Ethiopia
Event	1st	2nd	3rd
Olympic Games	2	0	0
World Championships	4	2	1
World Indoor Championships	4	0	0
African Championships	0	1	1
World Cross Country Championships	0	0	1
Total	10	3	3
Olympic Games
Gold medal – first place	2000 Sydney	10,000 m
Gold medal – first place	1996 Atlanta	10,000 m
World Championships
Gold medal – first place	1999 Seville	10,000 m
Gold medal – first place	1997 Athens	10,000 m
Gold medal – first place	1995 Gothenburg	10,000 m
Gold medal – first place	1993 Stuttgart	10,000 m
Silver medal – second place	2003 Paris	10,000 m
Silver medal – second place	1993 Stuttgart	5000 m
Bronze medal – third place	2001 Edmonton	10,000 m
World Indoor Championships
Gold medal – first place	2003 Birmingham	3000 m
Gold medal – first place	1999 Maebashi	1500 m
Gold medal – first place	1999 Maebashi	3000 m
Gold medal – first place	1997 Paris	3000 m
African Championships
Silver medal – second place	1993 Durban	5000 m
Bronze medal – third place	1993 Durban	10,000 m
World Cross Country Championships
Silver medal – second place	1992 Boston	Junior race
Bronze medal – third place	1994 Budapest	Senior race
Bronze medal – third place	1994 Budapest	Senior team
World Half Marathon Championships
Gold medal – first place	2001 Bristol	Individual
Gold medal – first place	2001 Bristol	Team
World Junior Championships
Gold medal – first place	1992 Seoul	5000 m
Gold medal – first place	1992 Seoul	10,000 m

President of Ethiopian Athletic Federation
- In office 6 November 2016 – 14 November 2018
- Preceded by: Sileshi Sihine
- Succeeded by: Derartu Tulu

Haile Gebrselassie (Amharic: ኀይሌ ገብረ ሥላሴ, romanized: Haylē Gebre Silassē; born 18 April 1973) is an Ethiopian former long-distance track, road running athlete, and businessman. He won two Olympic gold medals and four World Championship titles over the 10,000 metres and won the Berlin Marathon on four consecutive occasions between 2006 and 2009. He also earned four world titles indoors and was the 2001 World Half Marathon Champion. He is considered to be one of the greatest long-distance runners of all time.

Haile had major competition wins at distances between 1,500 metres and the marathon, moving from outdoor, indoor and cross country running to road running in the latter part of his career. He broke 61 Ethiopian national records, ranging from 800 metres to the marathon, set 27 world records, and is regarded as one of the greatest long-distance runners in history. He won the 2008 Berlin Marathon with a world record time of 2:03:59, breaking his own world record by 27 seconds. The record stood for three years. Haile's 10,000 m Masters age group world record remains unchallenged since 2008. Due to his various achievements on track & road running events, many called him as the "Emperor of the Distance Running". Beyond his athletic achievements, he is a successful businessman, contributing to the development of his home country.

Haile was cited as one of the top 100 most influential Africans by New African in 2011. During the Hachalu Hundessa riots in 2020, Oromo mobs targeted the businesses and properties of non-Oromos. Haile's hotels and resort were burned and 400 employees lost their jobs. In 2021, in the midst of the Tigray War, he pledged to join the fighting against the Tigray People's Liberation Front.

He is often nicknamed The Emperor because of his achievements in distance running.

== Athletics career ==
=== Early career ===
Haile was born one of ten children in Asella, Ethiopia. As a child growing up on a farm, he used to run ten kilometres to school every morning, and the same distance back every evening. This led to a distinctive running posture, with his left arm crooked as if he was still holding his school books. Gebrselassie's mother died from cancer when he was six.

In 1992, Haile gained international recognition in Seoul, South Korea, when he won the 5000-metre and 10,000-metre races at the 1992 World Junior Championships and a silver medal in the junior race at the World Cross Country Championships held in Boston, the United States.

The following year, in 1993, Haile won the first of what would eventually be four consecutive world championships titles in the men's 10,000 metres at the 1993, 1995, 1997, and 1999 World Championships. His win in 1993 was however his most infamous as he accidentally stepped on the heel of Moses Tanui's shoe at the bell, causing it to fly off his foot. After the contact, with just one shoe, an angered Tanui moved out to a 10-meter lead, only to have Haile run him down on the final straight. Also at the 1993 World Championships he ran in the 5,000-metre race to finish a close second behind Ismael Kirui of Kenya. In 1994 he won a bronze medal at the IAAF World Cross Country Championships. Later that year he set his first world record by running 12:56.96 in the 5,000 metres, breaking Saïd Aouita's record by almost two seconds.

In 1995, Haile ran the 10,000 metres in 26:43.53 in Hengelo, the Netherlands, lowering the world record by nine seconds. That same summer, in Zürich, Switzerland, Haile ran the 5000 metres in 12:44.39, taking 10.91 seconds off the world record 12:55.30 (established by Kenya's Moses Kiptanui earlier in the year). Later that summer he won the 10k world championship with his final 200m being run in 25 seconds. This world record at the Weltklasse meet in Zürich was voted "Performance of the Year" for 1995 by Track & Field News magazine. At the same Weltklasse meet in Zürich in 1996, an exhausted Haile, suffering from blisters obtained on the hard track in Atlanta (where he had won the Olympic 10,000 metres gold), had no answer to the 58-second lap of Daniel Komen with five laps to go as Komen went on to win and just miss Haile's record, finishing in 12:45.09. In 1997, Haile turned the tables on Komen at the same meet. Coming off his third 10K world championship gold medal, Haile beat Komen in another Zürich classic on 13 August 1997, covering the final 200 metres in 26.8 seconds to break his 5000 metres world record with a time of 12:41.86. Komen, in turn, took Haile's record only nine days later when Komen ran a 12:39.74 performance in Belgium.

=== Middle career ===
The next year, 1998, saw Haile lowering the indoor world records for 2000 and 3000 metres, enjoying success outdoors by taking back both the 5000 and 10,000 metres world records, as well as earning a share in the Golden League jackpot for winning all of his races in the Golden League series that summer. In June 1998 in Hengelo, Netherlands, Haile set a 10,000 metres world record 26:22.75, breaking Paul Tergat's world record 26:27.85, running evenly paced 13:11/13:11 5K splits.

Just 13 days later, Haile took on the 5000 metres mark of Komen in Helsinki, Finland. Croatian pacemaker Branko Zorko took the pace out slowly, hitting 1000 metres in 2:33.91 and dropping out at the mile. Million Wolde and Assefa Mezgebu led Haile through 2000 metres in 5:05.62. His pacemakers could not maintain the pace, though, and Haile was left alone for a problematic solo effort six laps out. Hitting 3000 metres in 7:38.93, even the British commentators announcing the race counted him out. With four laps to go (8:40.00), Haile needed a sub-4-minute final 1,600 metres for the record. With one lap to go and in great pain, Haile took off, recording a final lap of 56.77 seconds and a final 1,600 metres of 3:59.36 (= 4:00.96-mile) to race to a 12:39.36 world record.

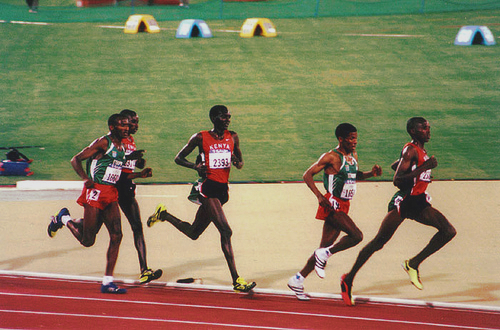
Haile (second, in green) on the way to becoming two-time 10,000 m Olympic champion in Sydney in 2000

In 1999, Haile starred as himself in the movie Endurance. The film chronicled his quest to win Olympic gold in the 10,000 metres in Atlanta. On the track, he won 1500/3000 metres double at the World Indoor Track Championships, defended his Outdoor World Track Championships 10,000 metres title, and remained undefeated in all his races (which ranged from 1500 up to 10,000 metres).

In 2000, Haile again won all of his races, ranking first in the world in both the 5000 and 10,000 metres. At the 2000 Sydney Olympics, he became the third man in history to successfully defend an Olympic 10,000 metres title (after Emil Zátopek and Lasse Virén). The narrow Olympic victory over Kenya's Paul Tergat came down to a blistering final kick, with Tergat's 26.3-second last 200 metres being topped by Haile's even faster 25.4. The winning margin of victory was only 0.09 seconds, closer than the winning margin in the men's 100-metre dash final.

On 26 August 2001, he ran his first half marathon (16 wins out of 20) and won in 1:04:34. Also in 2001, Haile won the IAAF World half Marathon Championships and the bronze medal in the 10,000 metres at the 2001 World Championships in Athletics. In the same year, he conceptualized the Great Ethiopian Run with Peter Middlebrook, which was latterly supported by Brendan Foster, British runner Richard Nerurkar the British ambassador to Ethiopia Myles Wickstead.

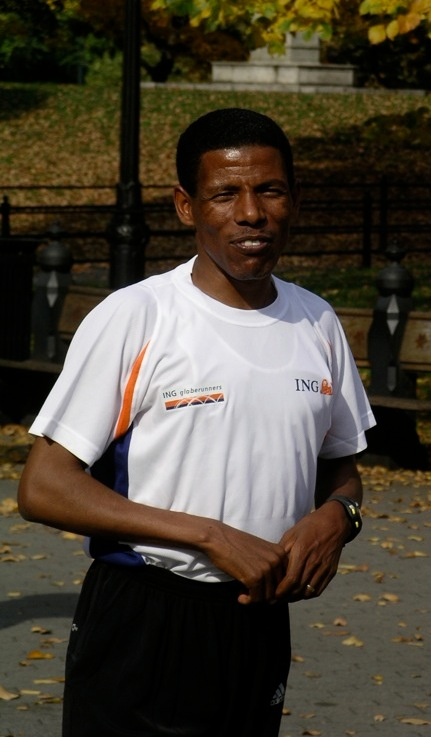
Haile in New York in 2003

On 30 August 2003, Haile topped the polls when elected as a member of the IAAF Athletes Commission. Also in 2003, at the World Championships in Paris, Haile was involved in one of the most remarkable 10,000 metres races of all time while gaining a silver medal behind countryman Kenenisa Bekele. The last half of the 10,000 metres final at the championships was completed in a staggering 12:57.24 (12:57.2 for Bekele and 12:58.8 for Haile). According to the IAAF, "Not only was this split the fastest closing 5000 metres in the championships 10,000m (the previous record was 13:12.12, recorded in Atlanta), but it was also the fastest 5000 metres in a global championship surpassing the 12:58.13 Salah Hissou recorded when he won the 5,000m in Sevilla'99." (This remark remained true until a week later when the World Athletic Championships 5000 metres medalists (including Bekele) all ran faster than the second 5000 metres split in the previous week's 10,000 metres.) "The difference between the closing 5000 metres splits (12:57.24) and the 5000 metres World record (12:39.36) was 17.98 seconds, which is a record. The previous best of 18.4 seconds (13:31.4 for the closing 5000 metres when the World Record was 13:13.0) was recorded in the 1976 Olympics."

In the 2004 Athens Olympics, Haile sought to become the first man in history to win three straight Olympic gold medals in the 10,000 metres. He was unable to do so due to an injury; however, he finished fifth in a race won by his compatriot Kenenisa Bekele, who had broken both of Haile's major track world records, the 5000 metres and the 10,000 metres records. Shortly before the Athens games, Haile was unable to train for three weeks due to inflammation of his Achilles tendon. The injury was severe enough that he would not have competed otherwise but did so because of significant pressure from his country. This loss in the final period of training likely cost him a medal.

=== Later career ===
Since leaving the track after the 2004 Olympics, Haile has focused on road racing and the marathon. His adult marathons to date include London 2002 (3rd place), Amsterdam 2005 (1st place), London 2006 (9th place), Berlin 2006 (1st place), Fukuoka 2006 (1st place), London 2007 (DNF), Berlin 2007 (1st place and World Record), Dubai 2008 (1st place), Berlin 2008 (1st place and another World Record), Dubai 2009 (1st place) Berlin 2009 (1st place), Dubai 2010 (1st place), and NYC 2010 (DNF).

In 2002, Haile made his debut at the marathon at the London Marathon. He started the race at a very fast pace, within world record time. He was unable to hold it, however, as world record holders Khalid Khannouchi and Paul Tergat both eventually passed him. Khannouchi broke his world record, while Haile finished third.

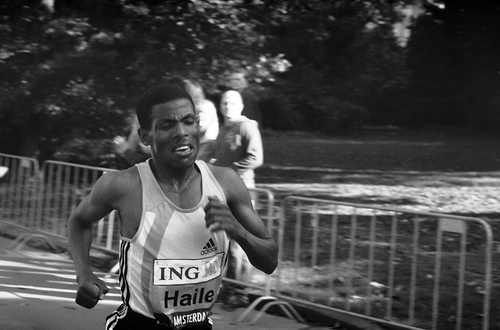
Haile shortly before winning the 2005 Amsterdam Marathon

In 2005, Haile went undefeated in all of his road races. This included a British all-comers' record in the 10K in Manchester (27:25), a win at the Amsterdam Marathon in the fastest marathon time in the world for 2006 (2:06:20), and a new world best for 10 miles in Tilburg Ten Miles race, The Netherlands (44:24). (His unofficial split of 41:22 at the 15K mark was 7 seconds faster than the official world best.)

Haile started 2006 positively on 15 January by setting his first world record on American soil. He ran the half marathon of the Rock 'n' Roll Arizona Marathon to beat Samuel Wanjiru 2005 record for the distance by a full 21 seconds with a time of 58 minutes and 55 seconds. During the race he passed the 20 km mark in 55:48, breaking also Paul Tergat's record for this distance which had stood since 1998. That year also marked another victory for Haile as he shattered the 25 km world road record (albeit in non-IAAF ratified fashion) by 68 seconds in a time of 1:11.37. The race was organized where Haile and six other runners would run 5 kilometres and then cross the starting line of the 20-K Alphen race in Alphen aan den Rijn of the Netherlands.

On 23 April 2006, he finished ninth in the London Marathon with a time of 2:09:05 (the race was won by Kenyan Felix Limo, who clocked 2:06:39). Haile referred to the ninth-place finish as "the worst race of my career". However, on 24 September he came back with a win in the Berlin Marathon in the fastest time of the year, 2:05:56. His time in Berlin made him only the fifth man in history to run under 2:06 for the marathon. This was followed by a win in the Fukuoka Marathon in Japan at 2:06:52.

In London on 22 April 2007, Haile challenged the 2006 London Marathon winner Felix Limo, 2005 London Marathon winner Martin Lel, 2004 Athens gold medalist Stefano Baldini, 2006 New York Marathon winner Marílson Gomes dos Santos, and the then marathon world record holder Paul Tergat in what organizers anticipated would be an exciting race. However Haile dropped out at the 18-mile (29 km) stage complaining of a stitch and inability to breathe, which turned out to be an allergic reaction to the pollen in the air. This left the 2005 winner Martin Lel to come home in the first place.

One month later, Haile made a surprise return to the track for the first of two stadium races that summer. In the first, he ran a 26:52.81 finishing fifth in a very competitive 10,000 metres race in Hengelo, The Netherlands. It was the first time a man over 30 ran the 10,000 m in less than 27 minutes. Then, on 27 June 2007, Haile launched an attack upon the world record for the one hour run, in Ostrava, Czech Republic. This record attempt was successful as Haile passed the hour mark at 21,285 metres (13 miles 397 yards), eclipsing the previous best of 21,101 metres, set by Mexican Arturo Barrios in La Flèche, France, on 30 March 1991. Furthermore, Haile covered 50 laps (20,000 m) in 56:25.98, another world best, well within the previous 56:55.6 also set by Barrios in 1991. These were his 23rd and 24th world records.

Haile made his running debut in New York City when he won the New York City Half Marathon on 5 August 2007, in 59:24, breaking the previous course record by two minutes. His win in the Lisbon Half Marathon (59:15) in March 2008 gave him a perfect record of 9–0 in winning all of his half marathons. He lost his first half marathon in Den Haag (14 March 2009), when he was beaten by Sammy Kitwara (59:47 for Kitwara, 59:50 for Haile).

On 30 September 2007, Haile won the Berlin Marathon in 2:04:26 (4:44.8 per mile), setting the world record and shaving 29 seconds off Paul Tergat's record, set on the same course in 2003. His victory further energized the celebrations of the Ethiopian Millennium (unique to the Ethiopian calendar), which began on 12 September 2007.

Before the 2008 Dubai Marathon, his manager suggested that Haile would be able to run a sub 2:04 time for a new world record. While Haile agreed that a sub 2:04 was possible, he stated that the conditions would need to be perfect for such a time. The event was held on 18 January 2008 and was won by Haile in a time of 2:04:53, making it the second-fastest marathon in history. However the early pace had been too fast and he was unable to continue at that speed, resulting in a time 27 seconds short of his world record.

At the Hengelo FBK-Games on 24 May, Haile ran 26:51.20 for the 10,000 metres to finish a close second behind countryman Sileshi Sihine's 26:50.53. This is the Master 35–39 age group world record. His nine career sub-27-minute 10,000-meter performances are more than any other athlete except for Kenenisa Bekele, who also has nine.

Because of Beijing's air pollution levels, Haile decided to withdraw from the marathon at the 2008 Beijing Olympics. He has asthma and said that running in such conditions might be harmful to his health. Haile later admitted that he regretted the decision as the Beijing air was cleaner than expected. He did, however, run the 10,000 metres on 17 August, finishing sixth with a time of 27:06.68. The gold medal went to his countryman and then world record holder, Kenenisa Bekele with a 27:01:17 Olympic record winning time. The following month, on 28 September 2008, he defended his Berlin Marathon title, averaging 2:56.5 per kilometer (4:43.7 per mile) for a time of 2:03:59, breaking his own world record by 27 seconds.

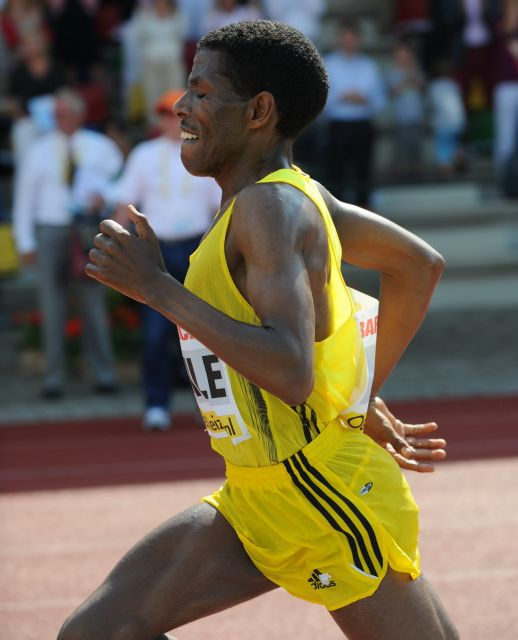
Haile competing at the FBK Games in Hengelo in 2009

Haile won the Dubai Marathon on 16 January 2009 but fell short of breaking his own world record that he had set four months earlier on the flat course. He finished in 2:05:29, well ahead of countryman Deressa Chimsa. In September of that year, he won the Berlin Marathon for the fourth consecutive time. He attempted to break the world record he had set the previous year but, despite a quick start, warm conditions saw him finish in 2:06:08, two minutes away from his best mark. He did, however, pass the 30-kilometer point in 1:27:49, which was a new world record for a road 30K.

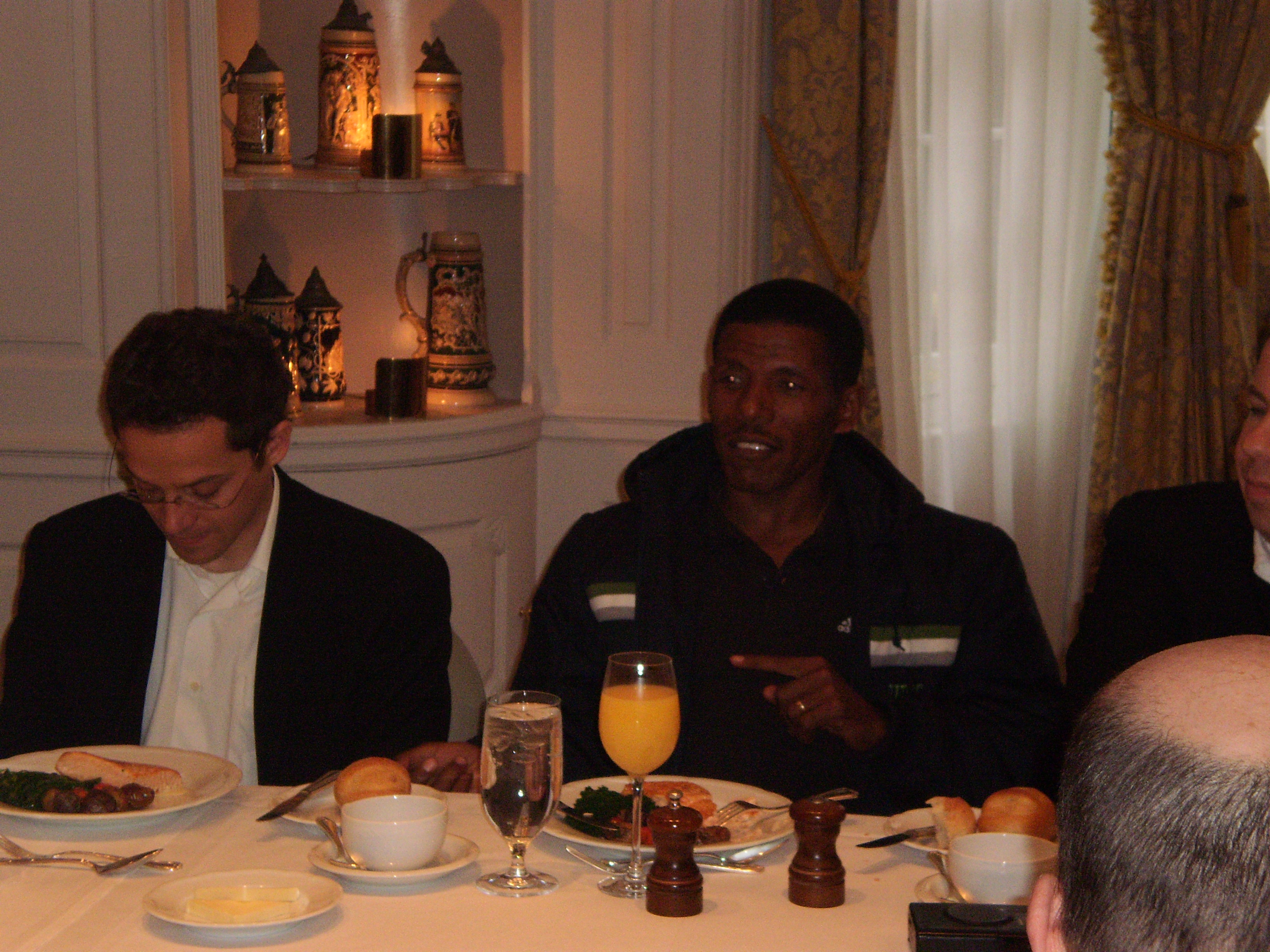
During an interview in New York in 2010

In 2010, he tried to attack his world record for the third consecutive time at the Dubai Marathon 2010. Although he won the race with a time of 2:06:09, he failed to break his 18-month world record. In a post-race interview, Haile revealed that he had suffered back pain, requiring intensive pre-race physiotherapy, resulting from having slept in a bad position. His problems continued at the NYC Half Marathon, where he pulled up mid-race visibly uncomfortable in his running. He had an easy victory in the inaugural edition of the 10K de Madrid in April. He scored his third victory at the Great Manchester Run the following month, although he missed out on Micah Kogo's course record. He followed this with his first win at the Great North Run in September, finishing the half marathon in a time of 59:33 minutes.

He is also mentor and ambassador for the G4S 4teen, a programme supporting 14 young athletes.

=== Retirement ===
On 7 November, after dropping out of the 2010 New York City Marathon with an inflamed knee, Haile announced his retirement. Days later, he posted to his Twitter account that he was reconsidering his decision and wanted to run in the 2012 London Olympics. Haile had stated previously that after retiring he would like to enter politics, with scepticism from the public about his knowledge on politics and the unfamiliar culture of celebrities holding public office in Ethiopia. However he won his first race back in a 10k road race in Angola with a new course record of 28:05 and beat countryman Deriba Merga and the Kenyan Josphat Menjo who had run the fastest 10000m of that year.

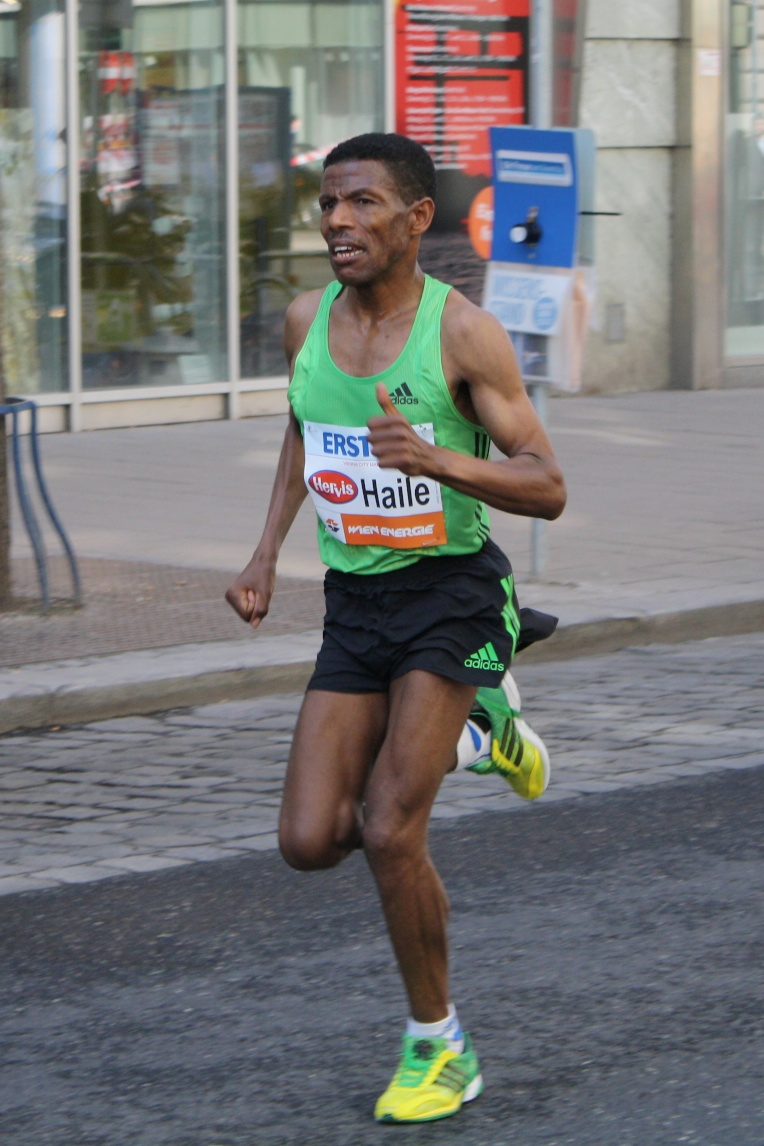
Haile at the Vienna City Marathon in 2011

Haile missed the 2011 Tokyo Marathon due to an injury, but won the half marathon at the Vienna City Marathon on 17 April 2011. About a month later Haile easily won the Great Manchester Run in England for the fourth time, finishing in 28:10. On 26 September he suffered a double setback when he dropped out of the Berlin Marathon (again suffering from respiratory difficulties of exercise-induced asthma) and saw his world records for 30 kilometres and the marathon broken by the man with whom he had been duelling, Patrick Makau. Haile was absent from the press conference later that day, but his manager Jos Hermens announced that while it was "the end of an era of record-breaking for Haile, it's not the end of his career". He returned to his winning ways at the Birmingham half marathon with a new course record and followed that up with a win at the Zevenheuvelenloop in November, taking his third career victory at the Dutch 15K race.

In 2012, Haile ran in the Tokyo Marathon and, after surging to the lead and putting a gap on the field with 6 km to go, faded and finished in 4th, in a time of 2:08:17. However, he bounced back to win the Vienna Half Marathon in 1:00:52, catching Paula Radcliffe who was given a 7:52-minute head-start. He was not selected for the Olympic marathon team, but after winning the Great Manchester Run with a fast time of 27:39, beating marathon world record holder Patrick Makau, world marathon leader Ayele Abshero and Olympic marathon medallist Tsegay Kebede, by a distance of over 100 metres, he decided to aim for a place in the 10,000 m race. He attempted to earn an Olympic spot at the Fanny Blankers-Koen Games in Hengelo, the stadium in which he had broken four world records. However, in extremely hot weather he finished seventh with a time of 27:20.39, sixth amongst Ethiopians, and did not qualify for the 2012 Summer Olympics. However, he did appear at the opening ceremony as one of the eight flagbearers who brought the Olympic flag into the stadium. Another outing at the Fukuoka Marathon, however, saw him enter as the favourite but drop out at 32 km.

On 14 April 2013, Haile won the open field of the Vienna City half marathon with a time of 01:01.14. He set his first over-40 world record with a time of 46:59 for 10 miles in Switzerland, on 15 September 2013. He took 3rd overall in the 2013 BUPA Great North Run, 32 seconds behind the winner Kenenisa Bekele and 31 seconds behind the reigning Olympic and world champion Mo Farah.

Haile has announced his retirement from competitive running after finishing 16th in the Great Manchester Run on Sunday 10 May 2015. It brings to an end a 25-year career in which he claimed two Olympic gold medals, eight World Championship victories and set 27 world records. "I'm retiring from competitive running, not from running. You cannot stop running, this is my life," he told BBC Sport.

Currently, Haile is the former president of the Ethiopian Athletics Federation, has been selling Hyundai cars in Addis Ababa, Ethiopia, since 2009, and cooperates with Hyundai for the Marathon Motors Engineering factory there which started assembling the electric Hyundai Ioniq in July 2020. He has become a small-lot coffee farmer in Ethiopia. His coffees can be found under his estate name, Haile Estate, such as the Sun Dried Ethiopian Haile Estate Coffee, which is distributed by Starbucks Reserve.

== Business career ==
Haile Gebrselassie ventured into an entrepreneurship career in 1995, investing earnings from his sporting achievements that led to establishing companies. Until recent years, he has had 600 staff and offices every day. In 2010, Haile opened Haile Resorts in Lake Hawassa, and the resort quickly expanded to include destinations in Amhara, Oromia, Southern Nations, Nationalities, and People's Region. He recently inaugurated the Grand Haile Resort in Addis Ababa headquartered in Lam Beret. Haile has a dealership for Hyundai cars in Ethiopia and started assembling Hyundai electric cars in 2020.

Haile owned Marathon Motors, a vehicle business that also assembles Hyundai cars, and which recently rolled off the first electric car from its assembly plant. Haile owned several businesses and is involved in real estate projects and owns four hotels, a coffee plantation. In 2015, there was estimated 1,000 employees and reached 3,000 employees across his investments in Ethiopia and beyond. Haile currently received 30 million birr revenue from various businesses.

Haile Gebrselassie is an ambassador for the German charity organisation "Menschen für Menschen", which is committed to the development of his home country of Ethiopia.

== Achievements ==
=== International competitions ===
Representing Ethiopia
Year	Competition	Venue	Position	Event	Result
1991	World Cross Country Championships	Antwerp, Belgium	8th	Junior race (8.415 km)	24:23
1991	World Cross Country Championships	Antwerp, Belgium	2nd	Team	26 pts
1992	World Cross Country Championships	Boston, United States	2nd	Junior race (7.8 km)	23:35
1992	World Cross Country Championships	Boston, United States	2nd	Team	28 pts
1992	World Junior Championships	Seoul, South Korea	1st	5000 m	13:36.06
1992	World Junior Championships	Seoul, South Korea	1st	10,000 m	28:03.99
1993	World Cross Country Championships	Amorebieta, Spain	7th	Senior race (11.75 km)	33:23
1993	World Cross Country Championships	Amorebieta, Spain	2nd	Team	82 pts
1993	African Championships	Durban, South Africa	2nd	5000 m	13:10.41
1993	African Championships	Durban, South Africa	3rd	10,000 m	27:30.17
1993	World Championships	Stuttgart, Germany	2nd	5000 m	13:03.17
1993	World Championships	Stuttgart, Germany	1st	10,000 m	27:46.02
1994	World Cross Country Championships	Budapest, Hungary	3rd	Senior race (12.02 km)	34:32
1994	World Cross Country Championships	Budapest, Hungary	3rd	Team	133 pts
1994	World Road Relay Championships	Litochoro, Greece	2nd	Marathon relay	1:58:51
1995	World Cross Country Championships	Durham, England	4th	Senior race (12.02 km)	34:26
1995	World Cross Country Championships	Durham, England	5th	Team	169 pts
1995	World Championships	Gothenburg, Sweden	—	5000 m	DNS
1995	World Championships	Gothenburg, Sweden	1st	10,000 m	27:12.95
1996	World Cross Country Championships	Stellenbosch, South Africa	5th	Senior race (12.15 km)	34:28
1996	World Cross Country Championships	Stellenbosch, South Africa	3rd	Team	107 pts
1996	Olympic Games	Atlanta, United States	—	5000 m	DNS
1996	Olympic Games	Atlanta, United States	1st	10,000 m	27:07.34
1997	World Indoor Championships	Paris, France	1st	3000 m	7:34.71
1997	World Championships	Athens, Greece	1st	10,000 m	27:24.58
1999	World Indoor Championships	Maebashi, Japan	1st	1500 m	3:33.77
1999	World Indoor Championships	Maebashi, Japan	1st	3000 m	7:53.57
1999	World Championships	Seville, Spain	1st	10,000 m	27:57.27
2000	Olympic Games	Sydney, Australia	1st	10,000 m	27:18.20
2001	World Championships	Edmonton, Canada	3rd	10,000 m	27:54.41
2001	World Half Marathon Championships	Bristol, England	1st	Half marathon	1:00:03
2001	World Half Marathon Championships	Bristol, England	1st	Team	3:00:31
2003	World Indoor Championships	Birmingham, England	1st	3000 m	7:40.97
2003	World Championships	Paris, France	2nd	10,000 m	26:50.77
2004	Olympic Games	Athens, Greece	5th	10,000 m	27:27.70
2008	Olympic Games	Beijing, China	6th	10,000 m	27:06.68

=== Marathon performances ===
Representing Ethiopia
Year	Competition	Venue	Position	Result
2002	London Marathon	London, United Kingdom	3rd	2:06:35
2005	Amsterdam Marathon	Amsterdam, Netherlands	1st	2:06:20
2006	London Marathon	London, United Kingdom	9th	2:09:05
2006	Berlin Marathon	Berlin, Germany	1st	2:05:56
2006	Fukuoka Marathon	Fukuoka, Japan	1st	2:06:52
2007	London Marathon	London, United Kingdom	—	DNF
2007	Berlin Marathon	Berlin, Germany	1st	2:04:26 WR
2008	Dubai Marathon	Dubai, United Arab Emirates	1st	2:04:53
2008	Berlin Marathon	Berlin, Germany	1st	2:03:59 WR
2009	Dubai Marathon	Dubai, United Arab Emirates	1st	2:05:29
2009	Berlin Marathon	Berlin, Germany	1st	2:06:08
2010	Dubai Marathon	Dubai, United Arab Emirates	1st	2:06:09
2010	New York City Marathon	New York, United States	—	DNF
2011	Berlin Marathon	Berlin, Germany	—	DNF
2012	Tokyo Marathon	Tokyo, Japan	4th	2:08:17
2012	Fukuoka Marathon	Fukuoka, Japan	—	DNF

=== Track and field circuit ===
Representing Ethiopia
Year	Competition	Venue	Position	Event	Notes
1995	Grand Prix Final	Monte Carlo, Monaco	10th	3000 m	
1998	Golden League	Europe	1st	Jackpot winner	Shared with Hicham El Guerrouj and Marion Jones
1998	Grand Prix Final	Moscow, Russia	1st	3000 m	

== World records and best performances ==
Distance	Mark	Date	Location	Notes
5000 metres	12:56.96	4 June 1994	Hengelo, Netherlands	
Two miles	8:07.46	28 May 1995	Kerkrade, Netherlands	world best
10,000 metres	26:43.53	5 June 1995	Hengelo, Netherlands	
5000 metres	12:44.39	16 August 1995	Zürich, Switzerland	
5000 metres	13:10.98	27 January 1996	Sindelfingen, Germany,	indoors
3000 metres	7:30.72	4 February 1996	Stuttgart, Germany,	indoors
5000 metres	12:59.04	20 February 1997	Stockholm, Sweden	indoors
Two miles	8:01.08	31 May 1997	Hengelo, Netherlands	third fastest time ever, world best
10,000 metres	26:31.32	4 July 1997	Oslo, Norway	
5000 metres	12:41.86	13 August 1997	Zürich, Switzerland	
3000 metres	7:26.15	25 January 1998	Karlsruhe, Germany	indoors
2000 metres	4:52.86	15 February 1998	Birmingham, UK	indoors
10,000 metres	26:22.75	1 June 1998	Hengelo, Netherlands	
5000 metres	12:39.36	13 June 1998	Helsinki, Finland	
5000 metres	12:50.38	14 February 1999	Birmingham, UK	indoors
10 kilometres	27:02	11 December 2002	Doha, Qatar	road race
Two miles	8:04.69	21 February 2003	Birmingham, UK	indoors, world best
15 kilometres	41:22 +	4 September 2005	Tilburg, Netherlands	road race, not IAAF-ratified
10 miles	44:24	4 September 2005	Tilburg, Netherlands	road race, world best
20 kilometres	55:48 +	15 January 2006	Tempe, US	
Half marathon	58:55	15 January 2006	Tempe, US	
25 kilometres	1:11:37	12 March 2006	Alphen aan den Rijn, Netherlands	road race, not IAAF-ratified – no post-race EPO test
One hour run	21,285 m	27 June 2007	Ostrava, Czech Republic	
20,000 metres	56:25.98 +	27 June 2007	Ostrava, Czech Republic	
Marathon	2:04:26	30 September 2007	Berlin, Germany	
Marathon	2:03:59	28 September 2008	Berlin, Germany	
30 kilometres	1:27:49 +	20 September 2009	Berlin, Germany	

== Personal bests ==
Outdoor track
Distance	Time	Date	Location	Notes
1500 metres	3:33.73	6 June 1999	Stuttgart, Germany	
Mile run	3:52.39	27 June 1999	Gateshead, United Kingdom	
3000 metres	7:25.09	28 August 1998	Brussels, Belgium	~~NR~~
Two miles	8:01.08	31 May 1997	Hengelo, Netherlands	~~NBP~~
5000 metres	12:39.36	13 June 1998	Helsinki, Finland	
10,000 metres	26:22.75	1 June 1998	Hengelo, Netherlands	
20,000 metres	56:26.0h	27 June 2007	Ostrava, Czech Republic	
One hour run	21,285 m	27 June 2007	Ostrava, Czech Republic	African record

Road
Distance	Time	Date	Location	Notes
10 km	27:02	13 December 2002	Doha, Qatar	
15 km	41:38	11 November 2001	Nijmegen, Netherlands	
10 miles	44:24	4 September 2005	Tilburg, Netherlands	~~World best~~
20 km	55:48+	15 January 2006	Tempe, United States	
Half marathon	58:55	15 January 2006	Tempe, United States	
25 km	1:11:37	12 March 2006	Alphen aan den Rijn, Netherlands	
Marathon	2:03:59	28 September 2008	Berlin, Germany	

Indoor track
Distance	Time (min)	Date	Location
800 metres	1:49.35	9 February 1997	Dortmund, Germany
1500 metres	3:31.76	1 February 1998	Stuttgart, Germany
2000 metres	4:52.86	15 February 1998	Birmingham, United Kingdom
3000 metres	7:26.15	25 January 1998	Karlsruhe, Germany
Two miles	8:04.69	21 February 2003	Birmingham, United Kingdom
5000 metres	12:50.38	14 February 1999	Birmingham, United Kingdom

== Filmography ==
Title	Year	Genre	Role
Endurance	1998	Docudrama	Main
Min Alesh?	2019	Drama	Supporting

Records
Preceded by Saïd Aouita; Moses Kiptanui; Daniel Komen	Men's 5000 m world record holder 4 June 1994 – 6 June 1995; 16 August 1995 – 22 August 1997; 13 June 1998 – 31 May 2004	Succeeded by Moses Kiptanui; Daniel Komen; Kenenisa Bekele
Preceded by William Sigei; Salah Hissou; Paul Tergat	Men's 10,000 m world record holder 5 June 1995 – 23 August 1996; 4 August 1997 – 22 August 1997; 1 June 1998 – 8 June 2004	Succeeded by Salah Hissou; Paul Tergat; Kenenisa Bekele
Preceded by (Kenya) Samuel Wanjiru	Men's half marathon world record holder 15 January 2006 – 9 February 2007	Succeeded by (Kenya) Samuel Wanjiru
Preceded by (Kenya) Paul Tergat	Men's marathon world record holder 30 September 2007 – 25 September 2011	Succeeded by (Kenya) Patrick Makau
Awards and achievements
Preceded by Noureddine Morceli; Wilson Kipketer	Men's Track & Field Athlete of the Year; 1995; 1998	Succeeded by Michael Johnson; Hicham El Guerrouj
Preceded by Spain national football team	Prince of Asturias Award for Sports; 2011	Succeeded by Iker Casillas & Xavi
Sporting positions
Preceded by Daniel Komen	Men's 3000 m Best Year Performance; 1997–1998	Succeeded by Hicham El Guerrouj
Preceded by Ismael Kirui; Daniel Komen	Men's 5000 m Best Year Performance; 1994–1995; 1998–1999	Succeeded by Daniel Komen; Brahim Lahlafi
Preceded by Fabián Roncero; Zersenay Tadese; Samuel Wanjiru	Men's Half Marathon Best Year Performance; 2002; 2006; 2008 (tied with Deriba Merga)	Succeeded by Hendrick Ramaala; Samuel Wanjiru; Patrick Makau
