= Athletics at the 1994 Commonwealth Games – Men's 10,000 metres =

Men's 10,000 metres at the Commonwealth Games

The men's 10,000 metres event at the 1994 Commonwealth Games was held on 27 August in Victoria, British Columbia

== Results ==
Rank	Name	Nationality	Time	Notes
1st place, gold medalist(s)	Lameck Aguta	Kenya	28:38.22	
2nd place, silver medalist(s)	Tendai Chimusasa	Zimbabwe	28:47.72	
3rd place, bronze medalist(s)	Fackson Nkandu	Zambia	28:51.72	
4	Martin Jones	England	29:08.53	
5	Peter Fonseca	Canada	29:14.85	
6	Eamonn Martin	England	29:15.81	
7	Munusamy Ramachandran	Malaysia	29:30.19	
8	Paul Patrick	Australia	29:35.95	
9	Daniel Komen	Kenya	29:37.91	
10	Chris Robison	Scotland	29:50.23	
11	Phillip Clode	New Zealand	29:50.93	
12	Paul McCloy	Canada	30:09.91	
13	Zacharia Ditetso	Botswana	30:14.87	
14	Isaac Simelane	Swaziland	30:28.42	
15	Pamenos Ballantyne	Saint Vincent and the Grenadines	31:06.70	
	Kabo Gabaseme	Botswana	DNF	
	Brendan Matthias	Canada	DNF	
	Thabiso Moqhali	Lesotho	DNF	
	Robbie Johnston	New Zealand	DNF	
	John Sherban	Scotland	DNF	
	Justin Hobbs	Wales	DNF	
	Robert Denmark	England	DNS	
	Andrew Larouche	Malawi	DNS	
	Smartex Tambala	Namibia	DNS	
	Dermot Donnelly	Northern Ireland	DNS	
	James Campbell	Northern Ireland	DNS	
	Phillimon Hanneck	Zimbabwe	DNS	
