= Patrick Rama =

South African long-distance runner (born 1965)

Personal information
- Nationality: Lesotho, South Africa
- Born: 25 May 1965 (age 61)

Sport
- Sport: Long-distance running
- Event: 10,000 metres

Patrick Rama (born 25 May 1965) is a Lesotho and South African former long-distance runner. He competed in the men's 10,000 metres at the 1992 Summer Olympics representing Lesotho. At the 1994 IAAF World Cross Country Championships, he represented South Africa.
