= 1992 World Junior Championships in Athletics – Men's 5000 metres =

The men's 5000 metres event at the 1992 World Junior Championships in Athletics was held in Seoul, South Korea, at Olympic Stadium on 17 and 19 September.

== Medalists ==
Gold	Haile Gebrselassie; Ethiopia
Silver	Ismael Kirui; Kenya
Bronze	Hicham El-Guerrouj; Morocco

== Results ==
=== Final ===
19 September

Rank	Name	Nationality	Time	Notes
1st place, gold medalist(s)	Haile Gebrselassie	Ethiopia	13:36.06	
2nd place, silver medalist(s)	Ismael Kirui	Kenya	13:36.11	
3rd place, bronze medalist(s)	Hicham El-Guerrouj	Morocco	13:46.79	
4	Kazuhiro Kawauchi	Japan	13:48.51	
5	Francis Nade	Tanzania	13:52.80	
6	Shadrack Hoff	South Africa	13:56.15	
7	Meta Petro	Tanzania	13:57.36	
8	Gerbaba Eticha	Ethiopia	13:57.38	
9	Miroslav Vanko	Czechoslovakia	14:00.24	
10	Simon Morolong	South Africa	14:04.96	
11	Wener Kashayev	Commonwealth of Independent States	14:05.95	
12	Emerson Bem	Brazil	14:08.36	
13	Charles Tangus	Kenya	14:08.85	
14	Davide Raineri	Italy	14:08.97	
15	Spencer Barden	United Kingdom	14:26.23	

=== Heats ===
17 September

==== Heat 1 ====
Rank	Name	Nationality	Time	Notes
1	Haile Gebrselassie	Ethiopia	14:00.10	Q
2	Charles Tangus	Kenya	14:00.61	Q
3	Kazuhiro Kawauchi	Japan	14:01.65	Q
4	Shadrack Hoff	South Africa	14:02.97	Q
5	Hicham El-Guerrouj	Morocco	14:03.93	Q
6	Francis Nade	Tanzania	14:04.51	q
7	Wener Kashayev	Commonwealth of Independent States	14:05.21	q
8	Karl Rasmussen	Norway	14:15.91	
9	Juan Luis Gómez	Spain	14:17.02	
10	António Rebelo	Portugal	14:24.28	
11	Tarek Zoghmar	Algeria	14:28.87	

==== Heat 2 ====
Rank	Name	Nationality	Time	Notes
1	Ismael Kirui	Kenya	13:52.19	Q
2	Meta Petro	Tanzania	13:54.02	Q
3	Simon Morolong	South Africa	13:59.30	Q
4	Emerson Bem	Brazil	13:59.78	Q
5	Miroslav Vanko	Czechoslovakia	14:00.56	Q
6	Gerbaba Eticha	Ethiopia	14:02.77	q
7	Spencer Barden	United Kingdom	14:06.33	q
8	Davide Raineri	Italy	14:11.42	q
9	Daisuke Isomatsu	Japan	14:12.89	
10	Arnaud Crepieux	France	14:58.59	
11	Raul Silva	Portugal	15:15.97	

== Participation ==
According to an unofficial count, 22 athletes from 16 countries participated in the event.

- Algeria (1)
- Brazil (1)
- Commonwealth of Independent States (1)
- Czechoslovakia (1)
- Ethiopia (2)
- France (1)
- Italy (1)
- Japan (2)
- Kenya (2)
- Morocco (1)
- Norway (1)
- Portugal (2)
- South Africa (2)
- Spain (1)
- Tanzania (2)
- United Kingdom (1)
