= Dmitry Kapitonov =

Russian long-distance runner

Dmitriy Kapitonov (Russian: Дмитрий Капитонов; born 10 April 1968) is a former long-distance runner from Russia, who won the 1997 edition of the Enschede Marathon, on 8 June 1997, clocking a total time of 2:12:09. He represented his native country at the 2000 Summer Olympics at the men's marathon in Sydney, Australia. There he finished in 34th place (2:19:38).

== Achievements ==
- All results regarding marathon, unless stated otherwise

Year	Competition	Venue	Position	Notes
Representing Russia
1997	Enschede Marathon	Enschede, Netherlands	1st	2:12:09
2000	Olympic Games	Sydney, Australia	34th	2:19:38
2001	Tokyo Marathon	Tokyo, Japan	3rd	2:11:09
