= Ayele Mezgebu =

Ethiopian long-distance runner

Ayele Mezgebu (born 6 January 1973) is an Ethiopian retired long-distance runner who specialized in cross-country running. HIs best finish in international competitions was a second-place finish in the 3,000 metres steeplechase at the 1992 World Junior Championships.

He is the older brother of Assefa Mezgebu.

== International competitions ==
Year	Competition	Venue	Position	Event	Notes
Representing Ethiopia
1992	World Junior Championships	Seoul, South Korea	2nd	3000 m steeplechase	8:32.43
1994	World Cross Country Championships	Budapest, Hungary	8th	Long race (12.06 km)	35:14
1994	World Cross Country Championships	Budapest, Hungary	3rd	Team competition	133 pts
1995	World Cross Country Championships	Durham, United Kingdom	21st	Long race (12.02 km)	35:11
1995	World Cross Country Championships	Durham, United Kingdom	5th	Team competition	169 pts
1995	All-Africa Games	Harare, Zimbabwe	3rd	5000 m	13:46.02
1996	World Cross Country Championships	Stellenbosch, South Africa	21st	Long race (12.15 km)	35:23
1996	World Cross Country Championships	Stellenbosch, South Africa	3rd	Team competition	107 pts
1997	World Cross Country Championships	Turin, Italy	18th	Long race (12.333 km)	36:33
1997	World Cross Country Championships	Turin, Italy	3rd	Team competition	125 pts
1998	World Cross Country Championships	Marrakesh, Morocco	21st	Long race (12 km)	35:29
1998	World Cross Country Championships	Marrakesh, Morocco	2nd	Team competition	57 pts
