= Andrea Arlati =

Italian long-distance runner (born 1970)

Personal information
- Nationality: Italian
- Born: 7 May 1970 (age 56)

Sport
- Country: Italy
- Sport: Athletics
- Event: Long-distance running

Achievements and titles
- Personal best: 5000 m: 13:28.12 (2000)

Andrea Arlati (born 7 May 1970) is a former Italian male long-distance runner who competed at three editions of the IAAF World Cross Country Championships at senior level (1994, 1995, 1999) and one of the IAAF World Half Marathon Championships (1995).
