= Tiyapo Maso =

Botswana long-distance runner

Personal information
- Nationality: Botswana
- Born: 30 December 1972 (age 53)

Sport
- Sport: Long-distance running
- Event: Marathon

Tiyapo Maso (born 30 December 1972) is a Botswana long-distance runner. He competed in the men's marathon at the 2000 Summer Olympics.
