= Mary Jane Richards =

British actress (1843–1904)

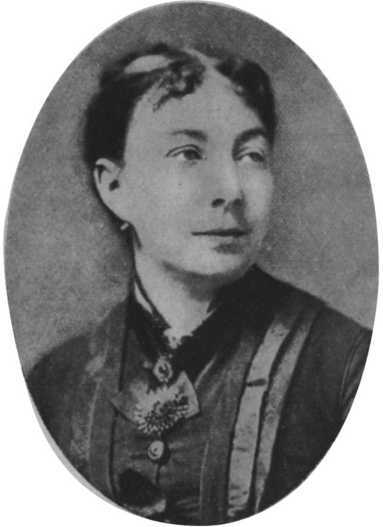
Mary Jane „Polly“ Richards, ca. 1880

Mary Jane Richards (born 1843; died in November 1904), born Blair, was a British theatre actress and the mother of the writer Edgar Wallace.

== Biography ==
Little information is available about the biography of Mary Jane Richards. She was born as Marie Jane Blair in Bradford, United Kingdom, and got the nickname "Polly". She married a sailor who has been handed down as Captain Richards and became pregnant by him before he went to sea again and never returned. Her daughter Josephine Richards emerged from this relationship.

Mary Jane joined the theatre group around the actress Alice Marriott in Liverpool where she herself worked as an actress and ballet dancer. During this employment she had an affair with Marriott's son Richard Horatio Marriott Edgar and got pregnant by him. She concealed the affair and the pregnancy and gave birth to her son alone with the help of a midwife at Asburnham Grove in Greenwich. There she had him baptized as the son of "Walter Wallace", who probably did not exist, registered as Richard Horatio Edgar Wallace.

Immediately after his birth, the son was taken in by the London fishmonger George Freeman and his wife for a fee and was given the name Richard Horatio Edgar Freeman, abbreviated to Dick Freeman. Mary Jane went back to the theatre group.

When Mary Jane fell ill in her old age, she came to Edgar Wallace in 1904 and asked him for financial support. He refused on the grounds that she had not taken care of him after his birth. She died shortly afterwards in the poorhouse in Bradford.

== Literatur ==
- Margaret Lane: Edgar Wallace: the biography of a phenomenon, 1938
  - Edgar Wallace : Das Leben eines Phänomens (Übersetzung von Wilm Wolfgang Elwenspoek), Krüger, Hamburg 1966
- Joachim Kramp, Jürgen Wehnert: Das Edgar Wallace Lexikon. Leben, Werk, Filme. Es ist unmöglich, von Edgar Wallace nicht gefesselt zu sein! Verlag Schwarzkopf & Schwarzkopf, Berlin 2004, ISBN 3-89602-508-2.
