= Kanako Haginaga =

Japanese runner

Kanako Haginaga (萩永 佳奈子, Haginaga Kanako; born 15 November 1975) is a retired Japanese runner who specialized in marathons and cross-country running.

She won the silver medal in the junior race at the 1993 Asian Cross Country Championships. At the 1994 World Cross Country Championships she finished eighteenth in the junior race, and won a bronze medal in the team competition. At the 1995 World Cross Country Championships she finished twentieth in the senior race and ended fourth in the team competition. She finished fifth at the 1996 World Half Marathon Championships.

Her personal best times were 15:47.3 minutes in the 5000 metres, achieved in May 1996 in Nishinomiya; 32:18.10 minutes in the 10,000 metres, achieved in May 1995 in Kobe; and 1:09:47 hours in the half marathon, achieved in July 1996 in Sapporo.
