= African Marathon Championships =

1994 and 1996 marathon

- Sport: Marathon running
- Founded: 1994
- Continent: Africa (CAA)

The African Marathon Championships was a biennial marathon running competition between athletes from Africa. A short-lived event, it was first staged in 1994 and held for a second and final time in 1996. The inaugural event was held on 4 December in Abidjan, Ivory Coast and the ultimate event on 1 December in Soweto, South Africa. The 1996 race was incorporated into the Soweto Marathon.

The championships was created as a result of changes to the African Championships in Athletics programme in 1990, which removed the men's marathon from the regular list of events. Prior to that, the men's marathon had featured since the debut of the main championships in 1979, bar an interruption in 1984. The discrete African Marathon Championships marked the introduction of a men's team marathon format and a women's individual marathon – neither of which had been contested by athletes from the continent, nor since the championships dissolution. The team format was scored by combining the finishing positions of a country's top three athletes, with the lowest score winning the event. Teams of fewer than three finishers were ineligible for medals.

South Africa proved to be the most successful nation during the competition's lifetime, winning both of the men's individual titles, the first men's team title, and the last women's individual title. Ethiopia was the next most successful, having won the remaining men's team title and the first women's title – it had a medal sweep in the first women's race. Nine African nations reached the podium across the tournament's two editions.

Andries Pilusa and Adam Motlagale were the men's race winners and Motlagale's 1996 time of 2:21:09 hours proved to be the best of the championships. Ethiopia's Elfenesh Alemu won the 1994 women's title in 3:08:05 hours – a time which was beaten by Sarah Mokgotla, whose win in 2:56:53 hours made her the only woman to dip under the three-hour mark at the event. The championships pre-dated Kenyan dominance of the road distance and 1996 bronze men's medallist Geoffrey Kinyua remains the only Kenyan to have won an African-level medal in the marathon (covering this event, the main athletics championships and the All-Africa Games).

The event was the fourth discrete continental marathon championship to be established after the European Marathon Cup (1981), Asian Marathon Championship (1988), and the South American Marathon Championships (April 1994).

== Medallists ==
=== Men's individual ===
Year	Gold		Silver		Bronze	
1994	Andries Pilusa (RSA)	2:25:13	Mohammed Abbas Mustapha (NGR)	2:30:48	Guirna Lema (ETH)	2:32:52
1996	Adam Motlagale (RSA)	2:21:09	Willy Kalombo Mwenze (ZAI)	2:21:54	Geoffrey Kinyua (KEN)	2:22:38

=== Men's team ===
Year	Gold		Silver		Bronze	
1994	South Africa	22	Niger	39	Ivory Coast	40
1996	Ethiopia	18	South Africa	24	Eswatini	28

=== Women's individual ===
Year	Gold		Silver		Bronze	
1994	Elfenesh Alemu (ETH)	3:08:05	Emebet Abosa (ETH)	3:15:44	Fantaye Sirak (ETH)	3:19:05
1996	Sarah Mokgotla (RSA)	2:56:53	Angelina Mantokoane Pitso (LES)	3:02:27	Renée Scott (RSA)	3:05:39

== Medal table ==
Rank	Nation	Gold	Silver	Bronze	Total
1	South Africa (RSA)	4	1	1	6
2	Ethiopia (ETH)	2	1	2	5
3	Lesotho (LES)	0	1	0	1
3	Niger (NIG)	0	1	0	1
3	Nigeria (NGR)	0	1	0	1
3	Zaire (ZAI)	0	1	0	1
7	Eswatini (SWZ)	0	0	1	1
7	Ivory Coast (CIV)	0	0	1	1
7	Kenya (KEN)	0	0	1	1
Totals (9 entries)		6	6	6	18
