= Rie Ueno =

Japanese long-distance runner

Personal information
- Born: June 11, 1976 (age 50)

Sport
- Sport: Track and field
Medal record
Representing Japan
Summer Universiade
Gold medal – first place	1999 Palma de Mallorca	5000m

Rie Ueno (born June 11, 1976) is a female long-distance runner from Japan, who is best known for winning the women's 5,000 metres at the 1999 Summer Universiade.

She won the first ever women's race at the Kagawa Marugame Half Marathon in 2000, finishing in a time of 1:09:57.

== International competitions ==
Year	Competition	Venue	Position	Event	Notes
Representing Japan
1999	Summer Universiade	Palma de Mallorca, Spain	1st	5000 metres	

== Personal bests ==
- 5000 metres - 15:28.73 min (1999)
- Half marathon - 1:09:57 hrs (2000)
