= Abeba Tolla =

Ethiopian long-distance runner

Abeba Tolla (born 3 June 1977) is an Ethiopian long-distance runner who specializes in marathons.

== Positions ==
In 1997 Tolla won a bronze medal at the African Half Marathon Championships . With a time of 1:21:44 she finished behind her compatriots Meseret Kotu (gold 1:17:09) and Leila Aman (silver, 1:17:48). In 1999 she won the Lyon Marathon and Tiberias Marathon. The following year she won the San Sebastián Marathon.

In the Netherlands Ababa Tolla is particularly known for winning the Amsterdam Marathon in 2000 with a personal best of 2:29.54. Earlier that year, she was fourth in the Rotterdam Marathon . She also improved her personal best this year in the half marathon in 1:08:48.

== Personal records ==
| Part | Performance | Date | place |
|---|---|---|---|
| half marathon | 1:08:48 | 12 June 2000 | Malmö |
| marathon | 2:29.54 | 15 October 2000 | Amsterdam |

== Honors ==
=== Half-marathon ===
- 1997: African camp – 1:21:44
- 2000: 4th half marathon Malmo – 1:08:48
- 2000: 2000 IAAF World Half Marathon Championships – 1:15:59

=== Marathon ===
- 1997: Rome Marathon – 2:51.08
- 1998: Tiberias Marathon – 2:41.21
- 1998: Marathon of Lyon – 2:35.43
- 1999: Marathon of San Sebastian – 2:36.02
- 2000: Rotterdam Marathon – 2:33.50
- 2000: Amsterdam Marathon – 2:29.54
- 2001: Seoul International Marathon – 2:32.58
- 2002: Paris Marathon – 2:35.51
- 2002: Amsterdam Marathon – 2:41.18
- 2003: Prague Marathon – 2:37.20
- 2003: Rome Marathon – 2:33.48
- 2005: Rome Marathon – 2:34.11
- 2008: Bermuda International Marathon – 2:51.34
