= African Athletics Championships =

Continental athletics event

- Sport: Athletics
- Founded: 1979
- No. of teams: 54
- Continent: Africa (CAA)
- Most recent champion: Last winners lists

The African Athletics Championships is a continental athletics event organized by the Confederation of African Athletics (CAA), the continental association for the sport in Africa. Since its inaugural edition in 1979 it was at first organised intermittently with nine editions held in fourteen years until 1993. Following the tenth edition in 1996 it has been organised biennially on even years, and is always held in the same year as the Summer Olympics. The 21st edition was held in Asaba, Nigeria in August 2018.

The event featured a men's marathon from 1979 to 1990. Following it being dropped from the programme an African Marathon Championships was briefly contested. The event programme has roughly matched that of the IAAF World Championships in Athletics, with the exception of the 50 kilometres race walk.

The following list shows changes to the event programme:

- 1982, women's heptathlon and men's 20 km walk were added to replace women's pentathlon and men's 10 km walk.
- 1985, women's 10,000 m was added.
- 1988, women's 5 km walk was added. Discontinued since 1998.
- 1992, women's triple jump was added. Men's marathon, held from 1979 to 1990 (with the exception of 1984) was permanently dropped.
- 1996, women's 5000 metres was added.
- 1998, women's hammer throw was added. Women's 3000 metres was permanently removed from the programme, while men's 3000 metres event was held for the only time.
- 2000, women's pole vault was added. Women's 10 km walk was also added before being held again in 2002 and discontinued.
- 2004, women's 3000 m steeplechase and 20 km walk were added.
- 2022, mixed 4 × 400 metres relay was added.

== Championships ==
Edition	Year	City	Country	Date	Venue	Events	Nations	Athletes	Top of the medal table
1	1979	Dakar	Senegal	2–5 August	Stade Demba Diop	39	24	251	Nigeria
2	1982	Cairo	Egypt	25–28 August	Cairo International Stadium	39	18	297	Kenya
3	1984	Rabat	Morocco	12–15 July	Stade Moulay Abdellah	38	28	298	Kenya
4	1985	Cairo	Egypt	15–18 August	Cairo International Stadium	40	24	324	Nigeria
5	1988	Annaba	Algeria	29 August – 2 September	19 May 1956 Stadium	41	30	341	Nigeria
6	1989	Lagos	Nigeria	4–8 August	Lagos National Stadium	41	27	308	Nigeria
7	1990	Cairo	Egypt	3–6 October	Cairo International Stadium	41	23	218	Nigeria
8	1992	Belle Vue Maurel	Mauritius	25–28 June	Stade Anjalay	41	24	336	South Africa
9	1993	Durban	South Africa	23–27 June	Kings Park Stadium	41	32	294	South Africa
10	1996	Yaoundé	Cameroon	13–16 June	Ahmadou Ahidjo Stadium	40	33	307	Nigeria
11	1998	Dakar	Senegal	18–22 August	Stade Leopold Senghor	42	39	395	Nigeria
12	2000	Algiers	Algeria	10–14 July	Stade du 5 Juillet	43	43	411	Algeria
13	2002	Radès	Tunisia	6–10 August	Rades Olympic Stadium	43	42	417	South Africa
14	2004	Brazzaville	(Republic of the Congo) Congo	14–18 July	Stade Alphonse Massemba-Débat	44	42	431	South Africa
15	2006	Bambous	Mauritius	9–13 August	Stade Germain Comarmond	44	41	456	South Africa
16	2008	Addis Ababa	Ethiopia	30 April – 4 May	Addis Ababa Stadium	44	42	543	South Africa
17	2010	Nairobi	Kenya	28 July – 1 August	Nyayo Stadium	44	46	588	Kenya
18	2012	Porto-Novo	Benin	27 June – 1 July	Stade Charles de Gaulle	44	47	569	Nigeria
19	2014	Marrakesh	Morocco	10–14 August	Marrakesh Stadium	44	47	548	South Africa
20	2016	Durban	South Africa	22–26 June	Kings Park Stadium	44	43	720	South Africa
21	2018	Asaba	Nigeria	1–5 August	Stephen Keshi Stadium	44	52	800	Kenya
22	2022	Saint Pierre	Mauritius	8–12 June	Cote d’Or National Sports Complex	45	50	636	Kenya
23	2024	Douala	Cameroon	21–26 June	Japoma Stadium	45	54	800	South Africa
24	2026	Accra	Ghana	12–17 May	Legon Sports Stadium	45	54	1500	South Africa
25	2028	Gaborone	Botswana						
26	2030	Port Louis	Mauritius						

== Statistics ==
=== Points Wins by country ===
Overall points winners
Country	First	Second	Third	Total
South Africa	10	3	2	15
Nigeria	8	5	6	19
Kenya	5	9	7	21
Algeria	1	3	0	4
Morocco	0	2	4	6
Tunisia	0	2	1	3
Senegal	0	0	2	2
Ethiopia	0	0	2	2

=== All-time medal table (1979–2026) ===
Rank	Nation	Gold	Silver	Bronze	Total
1	Nigeria	169	136	101	406
2	Kenya	164	147	131	442
3	South Africa	154	136	127	417
4	Algeria	82	56	76	214
5	Ethiopia	55	71	69	195
6	Morocco	53	53	84	190
7	Senegal	45	57	56	158
8	Tunisia	39	42	35	116
9	Egypt	38	61	53	152
10	Ghana	35	36	35	106
11	Ivory Coast	30	35	34	99
12	Botswana	26	19	7	52
13	Cameroon	23	34	40	97
14	Burkina Faso	10	13	9	32
15	Madagascar	9	5	9	23
16	Mauritius	8	25	20	53
17	Uganda	8	14	19	41
18	Mozambique	6	3	1	10
19	Sudan	5	9	7	21
20	Namibia	5	3	7	15
21	Gabon	5	3	6	14
22	Seychelles	4	7	7	18
23	Benin	4	0	5	9
24	Tanzania	3	6	3	12
25	Zambia	3	5	5	13
26	Djibouti	3	5	4	12
27	Liberia	3	3	7	13
28	Zimbabwe	2	9	6	17
29	Burundi	2	3	7	12
30	Chad	2	2	3	7
31	Gambia	2	1	5	8
32	Rwanda	2	1	2	5
33	Niger	2	1	1	4
34	Eritrea	2	0	2	4
35	Central African Republic	1	1	3	5
36	DR Congo	1	1	1	3
36	Guinea	1	1	1	3
38	Lesotho	1	0	2	3
39	Angola	1	0	1	2
39	Libya	1	0	1	2
41	Eswatini	1	0	0	1
42	Mali	0	4	4	8
43	Congo	0	3	4	7
44	Togo	0	2	2	4
45	Guinea-Bissau	0	1	0	1
45	Somalia	0	1	0	1
47	Malawi	0	0	1	1
Totals (47 entries)		1,010	1,015	1,003	3,028

=== Most successful athletes ===
The best athletes of these championships are:

Men (Algeria) Hakim Toumi 7 gold medals
Women (Morocco) Zoubida Laayouni 7 gold medals
