= Zambia at the 2012 Summer Paralympics =

- IPC code: ZAM
- NPC: National Paralympic Committee of Zambia

in London
- Competitors: 2 in 1 sport
- Medals: Gold 0 Silver 0 Bronze 0 Total 0

Summer Paralympics appearances (overview)
- 1996; 2000; 2004; 2008; 2012; 2016; 2020; 2024

Zambia competed at the 2012 Summer Paralympics in London, United Kingdom from August 29 to September 9, 2012.

== Athletics ==
Men’s track

Athlete	Event	Heat		Final	
Athlete	Event	Result	Rank	Result	Rank
Lassam Katongo	800m T12	2:04.22	3	did not advance	
Lassam Katongo	1500m T13	4:27.81	11	did not advance	

Women’s field

Athlete	Event	Distance	Points	Rank
Rhodah Mutale	Shot put F57-58	4.59	200	17

== See also ==
- Zambia at the Paralympics
- Zambia at the 2012 Summer Olympics
