= Athletics at the 1996 Summer Paralympics – Men's marathon T52–53 =

Men's marathon T52-53 at the X Paralympic Games
- Paralympic Athletics
- Dates: 25 August
- Competitors: 63 from 30 nations

Medalists
1st place, gold medalist(s)		Franz Nietlispach	Switzerland
2nd place, silver medalist(s)		Kazuya Murozuka	Japan
3rd place, bronze medalist(s)		Heinz Frei	Switzerland

The Men's marathon T52-53 was a marathon event in athletics at the 1996 Summer Paralympics, for wheelchair athletes. Franz Nietlispach and Heinz Frei finished in gold and bronze medal positions respectively for Switzerland, ensuring that Nietlispach won his first marathon title and also setting a Personal Record. Of the sixty-three starters, fifty-six reached the finish line.

== Results ==
Place	Athlete	Time
1	Franz Nietlispach (SUI)	1:29:44
2	Kazuya Murozuka (JPN)	1:31:56
3	Heinz Frei (SUI)	1:32:42
4	Scot Hollonbeck (USA)	1:32:53
5	Prasopchoke Klunngern (THA)	1:32:59
6	Saul Mendoza (MEX)	1:33:22
7	Joël Jeannot (FRA)	1:35:04
8	Ben Robert Lucas (NZL)	1:35:13
9	Jeddie Schabort (RSA)	1:37:27
10	Jacob Heilveil (USA)	1:37:29
11	André Viger (CAN)	1:37:30
12	Josef Loisinger (AUT)	1:37:30
13	Aaron Gordian (MEX)	1:37:30
14	Jorge Luna (MEX)	1:37:31
15	Iwan van Breemen (NED)	1:37:31
16	Antonio Noguiera (POR)	1:37:32
17	Drazen Boric (GER)	1:37:32
18	Bong Lee (KOR)	1:37:33
19	Maximilian Weber (GER)	1:37:40
20	Ziv Bar-Shirha (ISR)	1:37:40
21	Thomas Gerlach (DEN)	1:37:42
22	Koichi Tatsumi (JPN)	1:39:11
23	Hideo Tanaka (JPN)	1:41:27
24	Bogdan Krol (POL)	1:42:50
25	Alexei Ivanov (RUS)	1:44:00
26	Paul Wiggins (AUS)	1:44:52
27	Mustapha Badid (FRA)	1:44:57
28	Georg Schrattnecker (AUT)	1:45:13
29	Peter Skornik (CZE)	1:45:39
30	Ernst van Dyk (RSA)	1:45:55
31	Enzo Masiello (ITA)	1:46:36
32	Marco Re Calegari (ITA)	1:46:54
33	Guido Muller (SUI)	1:47:17
34	Stephen Ellefson (CAN)	1:47:17
35	Arie de Graaf (NED)	1:47:17
36	Jack McKenna (GBR)	1:47:19
37	Orlando Cortes Perdigon (COL)	1:47:45
38	Frederic Periac (FRA)	1:47:54
39	Thomas Sellers (USA)	1:48:07
40	James Martinson (USA)	1:48:25
41	Serguei Shilov (RUS)	1:50:51
42	Ivan Newman (GBR)	1:51:21
43	Ampai Sualuang (THA)	1:52:01
44	Robert Thompson (GBR)	1:54:53
45	Yiannakis Gavriel (CYP)	1:56:13
46	Hans-Peter Berger (SUI)	1:56:15
47	Thomas Weinsheimer (GER)	1:57:18
48	Paul Nunnari (AUS)	1:57:18
49	Henricus van Hout (NED)	1:58:19
50	Robert Wickham (ZIM)	2:02:15
51	Omar Abi (ALG)	2:04:13
52	Wilson de la Cruz (ECU)	2:05:20
53	Gyorgy Legeza (HUN)	2:11:29
54	Eduardo Gomes Bacalhau (POR)	2:14:20
55	Angel Quevedo (ECU)	2:37:47
56	Lango Sinkamba (ZAM)	3:09:17
-	Vladislav Iachkine (RUS)	dnf
-	Robert Molinatti (USA)	dnf
-	Philippe Couprie (FRA)	dnf
-	Jean-Marc Berset (SUI)	dnf
-	Georges van Damme (BEL)	dnf
-	Serge Robert (FRA)	dnf
-	Edmund Makutya (ZIM)	dnf

== See also ==
- Marathon at the Paralympics
