= Zambia at the Deaflympics =

- IPC code: ZAM
- NPC: National Paralympic Committee of Zambia
- Medals: Gold 0 Silver 0 Bronze 0 Total 0

Summer appearances
- 2013; 2017; 2021

Zambia first competed at the Summer Deaflympics in 2013. The country also competed at the 2017 Summer Deaflympics held in Samsun, Turkey.

The country sent a delegation of three athletes to both events. In 2013, the country competed in events in athletics. In 2017, the country competed in badminton and cycling.

The country has not yet competed at the Winter Deaflympics.

== Medal tallies ==
=== Summer Deaflympics ===
Year	Gold	Silver	Bronze	Total
2013	0	0	0	0
2017	0	0	0	0
