= SOYA Awards =

Annual sports awards in Kenya

The SOYA Awards, also known as the Sport Personality of the Year Award, are annual national awards given for sports personalities and organisations in Kenya. The awards were initiated in 2004 by Paul Tergat. The awards for each year are held at the beginning of the next year (e.g. awards for 2008 are presented in January 2009). Winners must be a native of Kenya.

== Winners by year ==
=== 2004 ===
Following are the 2004 SOYA winners.

Category	Winner	Sport	References
Sportsman of the year	Henry Wanyoike	Athletics	
Sportswoman of the year	Catherine Ndereba	Athletics	
Sports team of the year (men)	Kenya national rugby sevens team	Rugby	
Sports team of the year (women)	National volleyball team	Volleyball	
Most Promising sportsman	Brimin Kipruto	Athletics	
Hall of Fame	Kipchoge Keino	Athletics	

=== 2005 ===
Following are the 2005 SOYA winners.

Category	Winner	Sport	References
Sportsman of the year	Benjamin Limo	Athletics	
Sportswoman of the year	Catherine Ndereba	Athletics	
Sports team of the year (men)	Kenya Chiba Ekiden relay team	Athletics	
Sports team of the year (women)	National volleyball team	Volleyball	
Most Promising sportsman	Samuel Wanjiru	Long distance running	
Most Promising sportswoman	Veronica Nyaruai Wanjiru	Running	
Hall of Fame	Joe Kadenge	Football	
Sports Federation	Kenya Secondary Schools Sports Association	General	
Special Category	Edwin Kipchumba	Paralympic	

=== 2006 ===
Following are the 2006 SOYA winners.

Category	Winner	Sport	References
Sportsman of the year	Alex Kipchirchir	Athletics	
Sportswoman of the year	Janeth Jepkosgei	Athletics	
Sports team of the year (men)	Junior World Cross Country team	Athletics	
Sports team of the year (women)	Kenya Commercial Bank	Volleyball	
Most Promising sportsman	David Dunford	Swimming	
Most Promising sportswoman	Pauline Korikwiang	Athletics	
Hall of Fame	Hardial Singh	Field hockey	
Sports Federation	Athletics Kenya		
Special Category	Francis Thuo	Paralympic	

=== 2007 ===
Following are the 2007 SOYA winners.

Category	Winner	Sport	References
Sportsman of the year	Jason Dunford	Swimming	
Sportswoman of the year	Janeth Jepkosgei	Athletics	
Sports team of the year (men)	Kenya national rugby sevens team	Rugby	
Sports team of the year (women)	Junior World Cross Country team	Athletics	
Most Promising sportsman	Asbel Kiprop	Athletics	
Most Promising sportswoman	Ruth Bosibori	Athletics	
Hall of Fame inductee	Paul Wekesa	Tennis	
Sports Federation	Kenya Motorsports Foundation		
Special Category (men)	Abraham Tarbei	Paralympic	
Special Category (women)	Betty Cheruiyot	Paralympic	
Community Hero	Tegla Loroupe	{aralympic	

=== 2008 ===
Following are the 2008 SOYA winners.

Category	Winner	Sport	References
Sportsman of the year	Samuel Wanjiru	Athletics	
Sportswoman of the year	Pamela Jelimo	Athletics	
Sports team of the year (men)	Kenya national rugby sevens team	Rugby	
Sports team of the year (women)	Kenya Prisons	Volleyball	
Most Promising sportsman	Josephat Bett	Athletics	
Most Promising sportswoman	Achieng Ajulu-Bushell	Swimming	
Hall of Fame inductee	Jonathan Niva	Football	
Sports Federation	Kenya Rugby Football Union	Football	
Special Category (men)	Henry Kiprono Kirwa	Paralympic	
Special Category (women)	Mary Nakhumicha Zakayo	Paralympic	
Community Hero	Juma Abdalla Kent	Basketball	
Coach of the Year	Julius Kirwa	Athletics	

=== 2009 ===
Following are the 2009 SOYA winners.

Category	Winner	Sport	References
Sportsman of the year	Collins Injera	Rugby union	
Sportswoman of the year	Linet Masai	Athletics	
Sports team of the year (men)	Kenya national rugby sevens team	Rugby union	
Sports team of the year (women)	World Cross Country Championships team	Athletics	
Most Promising sportsman	George Odhiambo	Football	
Most Promising sportswoman	Mercy Cherono	Athletics	
Hall of Fame inductee	Doris Wefwafwa	Volleyball	
Sports Federation	Athletics Kenya	Athletics	
Special Category (men)	David Kiptum	Paralympic athletics	
Special Category (women)	Mary Nakhumicha	Paralympic athletics	
Community Hero	Veronicah Osogo	Tennis	
Coach of the Year	Benjamin Ayimba	Rugby union	
Schools category (boys)	Laiser Hill Academy		
Schools category (girls)	Shimba Hills Secondary School		

=== 2010 ===
Following are the 2010 SOYA winners.

Category	Winner	Sport
Sportsman of the year	David Rudisha	Athletics
Sportswoman of the year	Nancy Lagat	Athletics
Sports team of the year (men)	Ulinzi Stars	Football
Sports team of the year (women)	Kenya Prisons	Volleyball
Most Promising sportsman	Caleb Mwangangi	Athletics
Most Promising sportswoman	Mercy Cherono	Athletics
Hall of Fame inductee	Wilson Kiprugut	Athletics
Sports Federation	Athletics Kenya	Athletics
Special Category (men)	Collins Wandera	Paralympic athletics
Special Category (women)	Mary Nakhumicha	Paralympic athletics
Community Hero	Brother Colm O'Connell	Athletics
Coach of the Year	Zedekiah Otieno	Football
Schools category (boys)	Kerugoya	
Schools category (girls)	Malava	

=== 2011 ===
Following are the 2011 SOYA winners.

Category	Winner	Sport
Sportsman of the year	Patrick Makau Musyoki	Athletics
Sportswoman of the year	Vivian Cheruiyot	Athletics
Sports team of the year (men)	Tusker FC	Football
Sports team of the year (women)	Kenya Prisons	Volleyball
Most Promising sportsman	Shivan Vinayak	Motocross
Most Promising sportswoman	Naomi Wafula	Golf
Hall of Fame	Robbie Armstrong	Cricket
Sports Federation	Athletics Kenya	Athletics
Special Category (men)	Abraham Cheruiyot Tarbei	Paralympic athletics
Special Category (women)	Jennifer Mutuko	Paralympic athletics
Community Hero	Rose Naliaka	Golf
Coach of the Year	Sammy Omollo	Football
Schools category (boys)	Laiser Hill Academy	
Schools category (girls)	Archbishop Njenga Girls High School	
Fair play	Priscah Cheptoo	
Outstanding performance of the year	Ezekiel Kemboi	

=== 2012 ===
Following are the 2010 SOYA winners.

Category	Winner	Sport
Sportsman of the year	David Lekuta Rudisha	Athletics
Sportswoman of the year	Mary Keitany	Athletics
Sports team of the year (men)	Tusker FC	Football
Sports team of the year (women)	Kenya women's national under-20 football team	Football
Most Promising sportsman	Timothy Kitum	Athletics
Most Promising sportswoman	Faith Kipyegon	Athletics
Hall of Fame inductee	Tekla Chemabwai	Athletics
Comeback of the Year	Pamela Jelimo	Athletics
Special Category (men)	Abraham Cheruiyot Tarbei	Paralympic athletics
Special Category (women)	Mary Nakhumicha Zakayo	Paralympic athletics
Coach of the Year	Caroline Kola	Athletics
Schools category (boys)	St. Anthony Boys High School	
Schools category (girls)	Malava Girls Secondary School	Volleyball

=== 2013 ===
Following are the 2013 SOYA winners.

Category	Winner	Sport
Sportsman of the year	Ezekiel Kemboi	Athletics
Sportswoman of the year	Edna Kiplagat	Athletics
Sports team of the year (men)	Kenya national rugby sevens team	Rugby 7s
Sports team of the year (women)	Kenya Prisons	Volleyball
Most Promising sportsman	Tejas Hirani	Motorsports
Most Promising sportswoman	Emily Muteti	Swimming
Hall of Fame inductee	Philip Waruinge	Boxing
Sports Federation	Kenya Secondary Schools Association	
Comeback of the Year	Roselyn Odhiambo	Volleyball
Special Category (men)	Simon Cherono	Paralympic athletics
Special Category (women)	Beryl Atieno	Paralympic athletics
Schools category (boys)	Upper Hill School	Basketball
Schools category (girls)	Kwanthanze High School	Volleyball

=== 2014 ===
Following are the 2014 SOYA winners.

Category	Winner	Sport
Sportsman of the year	Caleb Ndiku	Athletics
Sportswoman of the year	Eunice Sum	Athletics
Sports team of the year (men)	KCB RC	Rugby union
Sports team of the year (women)	Telkom Orange Hockey Club	Hockey
Most Promising sportsman	Ronald Kwemoi	Athletics
Most Promising sportswoman	Chanelle Wangari	Golf
Sports Federation	Kenya Volleyball Federation	Volleyball
Comeback of the Year	Innocent Simiyu	Rugby union
Sportsman with a disability	Nikhil Sachania	Motorsports
Sportswoman with a disability	Jane Wambui	Paralympic athletics
Coach of the Year	Jos Openda	Hockey
Schools category (boys)	Friends School Kamusinga	
Schools category (girls)	Shimba Hills Secondary School	

=== 2015 ===
Following are the 2015 SOYA winners.

Category	Winner	Sport
Sportsman of the year	Julius Yego	Athletics
Sportswoman of the year	Hyvin Kiyeng	Athletics
Sports team of the year (men)	Gor Mahia FC	Football
Sports team of the year (women)	Malkia Strikers	Volleyball
Most Promising sportsman	Kumari Taki	Athletics
Most Promising sportswoman	Agnes Tirop	Athletics
Hall of Fame	Brian Hokins; Violet Barasa; John Mucheru	Shooting; Volleyball; Golf
Sports Federation	Kenya Volleyball Federation	Volleyball
Comeback of the Year	David Lung’aho	Rugby
Sportsman with a disability	Onesmus Mutinda	Paralympic athletics
Sportswoman with a disability	Susan Gatwiri	Paralympic athletics
Coach of the Year	David Lung’aho	Volleyball
Outstanding performer (boy)	David Paristao	
Outstanding performer (girl)	Judith Nkatha	Tennis
Schools category (boys)	Laiser Hill Academy	
Schools category (girls)	Sinyolo Girls Secondary School	

=== 2016 ===
Following are the 2016 SOYA winners.

Category	Winner	Sport
Sportsman of the year	Eliud Kipchoge	Athletics
Sportswoman of the year	Vivian Cheruiyot	Athletics
Sports team of the year (men)	Kenya national rugby sevens team	Rugby 7s
Sports team of the year (women)	Harambee Starlets	Football
Most Promising sportsman	Kipyegon Bett	Athletics
Most Promising sportswoman	Mwanalima Adam Jereko	Football
Hall of Fame	Jackson Omaido; Naftali Temu	Rugby; Athletics
Sports Federation	Tennis Kenya	Tennis
Sportsman with a disability	Samuel Muchai	Paralympic athletics
Sportswoman with a disability	Nancy Chelangat Koech	Paralympic athletics
Coach of the Year	Jos Openda	Hockey
Outstanding performer (boy)	Allan Singar	Table tennis
Outstanding performer (girl)	Hadassah Gichovi	Swimming
Schools category (boys)	Kamusinga	Hockey
Schools category (girls)	Kaya Tiwi High School	Basketball
School Coach of the Year	Philip Onyango	Basketball

=== 2017 ===
Following are the 2017 SOYA winners.

Category	Winner	Sport
Sportsman of the year	Conseslus Kipruto	Athletics
Sportswoman of the year	Hellen Obiri	Athletics
Sports team of the year (men)	Kenya national under-19 cricket team	Cricket
Sports team of the year (women)	Lionesses	Rugby
Most Promising sportsman	Aman Gandhi (cricketer)	Cricket
Most Promising sportswoman	Jackline Wambui	Athletics
Hall of Fame	Stephen Muchoki; Allan Thigo	Boxing; Football
Sports Federation	Athletics Kenya	Athletics
Sportsman with a disability	Samuel Muchai	Paralympic athletics
Sportswoman with a disability	Beryl Wamira	Paralympic athletics
Coach of the Year	Jimmy Kamande	Cricket
Outstanding performer (boy)	Emmanuel Ndonga	Swimming
Outstanding performer (girl)	Faith Nyabera	Tennis
Schools category (boys)	Muhuri Muchiri High School	Rugby 7s
Schools category (girls)	Wiyeta Girls Secondary School	Football
School Coach of the Year	Kikechi Kombo	Rugby 7s

=== 2018 ===
Following are the 2018 SOYA winners.

Category	Winner	Sport
Sportsman of the year	Eliud Kipchoge	Athletics
Sportswoman of the year	Beatrice Chepkoech	Athletics
Sports team of the year (men)	Harambee Stars	Football
Sports team of the year (women)	Telkom Kenya	Volleyball
Most Promising sportsman	Edward Zakayo	Athletics
Most Promising sportswoman	Angella Okutoyi	Tennis
Sports Federation	Kenya Secondary Schools Sports Association	
Sportsman with a disability	Dickson Onduari	Handball
Sportswoman with a disability	Jane Ndenga	Wheelchair tennis
Coach of the Year	Kevin Wambua	Rugby
Schools category (boys)	Laiser Hill Academy	Rugby
Schools category (girls)	Kwale Girls High School	Football

=== 2019 ===
Following are the 2019 SOYA winners.

Category	Winner	Sport
Sportsman of the year	Eliud Kipchoge	Athletics
Sportswoman of the year	Hellen Obiri	Athletics
Sports team of the year (men)	KCB	Rugby
Sports team of the year (women)	Malaika Strikers	Volleyball
Most Promising sportsman	Geoffrey Okwach	Rugby
Most Promising sportswoman	Jentrix Shikangwa	Football
Sports Federation	Kenya Special Olympics	
Special Category (men)	Samwel Mushai Kimani	Athletics
Special Category (women)	Catherine Nyaga	??
Community Hero	Johanna Omolo	Football
Coach of the Year	Paul Bitok	Athletics
Most Outstanding Player (boys)	Stephen Ndegwa	Swimming
Most Outstanding Player (girls)	Maria Biranchi	Swimming
Schools category (boys)	Kakamega High School	Rugby
Schools category (girls)	Kwanthanze Secondary School	Volleyball
School Coach	Justin Kigwari – Kwanthanze Secondary School	Volleyball

=== 2021 ===
Following are the 2021 SOYA winners.

Category	Winner	Sport	References
Sportsman of the year	Ferdinand Omanyala	Athletics	
Sportswoman of the year	Faith Kipyegon	Athletics	
Sports team of the year (men)	Kenya national rugby sevens team	Rugby Sevens	
Sports team of the year (women)	Vihiga Queens	Football	
Most Promising Boy	Heristone Wafula	Athletics	
Most Promising Girl	Teresia Muthoni Gateri	Athletics	
Coach of the Year	Charles Okere	Football	

=== 2022 ===
Following are the 2022 SOYA winners.

Category	Winner	Sport	References
Sportsman of the year	Eliud Kipchoge	Athletics	
Sportswoman of the year	Faith Kipyegon	Athletics	
Sports team of the year (men)	Kabras Sugar	Rugby	
Sports team of the year (women)	KCB	Volleyball	
Most Promising Boy	Andrew Wahome	Golf	
Most Promising Girl	Madina Okot	Basketball	
Coach of the Year	Japheth Munala	Volleyball	

=== 2023 ===
Following are the 2023 SOYA winners.

Category	Winner	Sport	References
Sportsman of the year	Kelvin Kiptum	Athletics	
Sportswoman of the year	Faith Kipyegon	Athletics	
Sports team of the year (men)	Kabras Sugar	Rugby	
Sports team of the year (women)	Women's national 3x3 team	Basketball	
Most Promising Boy	Ishmael Kipkurui	Athletics	
Most Promising Girl	Valerie Nekesa	Football	
Coach of the Year	Evelyn Kidogo	Basketball	
School team of the year (boys)	Koyonzo High School	Rugby	
School team of the year (girls)	Kwanthanze High School	Volleyball	
School Coach of the year	Isaac Muresia	Volleyball	

=== 2024 ===
Following are the 2024 SOYA winners.

Category	Winner	Sport
Sportsman of the year	Emmanuel Wanyonyi	Athletics
Sportswoman of the year	Beatrice Chebet	Athletics
Sports team of the year (men)	Nairobi City Thunder	Basketball
Sports team of the year (women)	Junior Starlets	Football
Sportsman with disability	Michelle Cheng'etich	Para-athlietics
Sportswoman with disability	Samson Ojuka	Para-athlietics
Most Promising Boy	Ishmael Kipkurui	Athletics
Most Promising Girl	Valerie Nekesa	Football
Coach of the Year	Mildred Cheche	Football
School team of the year (boys)	All Saints Embu High School	Rugby
School team of the year (girls)	Kesogon Secondary School	Volleyball
School Coach of the year	Benson Mwenda	Rugby
Hall of Fame	John Bobby Ogolla	Football

=== 2025 ===
Following are the 2025 SOYA winners.

Category	Winner	Sport
Sportsman of the year	Emmanuel Wanyonyi	Athletics
Sportswoman of the year	Beatrice Chebet	Athletics
Sports team of the year (men)	Nairobi United	Football
Sports team of the year (women)	Junior Malkia Strikers	Volleyball
Sportsman with disability	Ian Kahinga	Para-athlietics
Sportswoman with disability	Sheilla Wanyoyi	Para-athlietics
Sports Personality Boy	Shane Chandaria	Motorsport
Sports Personality Girl	Marlyne Tata	Volleyball
Coach of the Year	Jackline Barraza	Volleyball
School team of the year (boys)	St. Luke's Boys' High School	Handball
School team of the year (girls)	Moi Girls Kamusinga Secondary School	Handball
School Coach of the year	Godgrey Simiyu	Handball
Hall of Fame	Tegla Loroupe	Athletics
Hall of Fame	Edward Rombo	Rugby

== Overall winners ==
Year	Sportsman of the Year		Sportswoman of the Year		References
Year	Winner	Sport	Winner	Sport	References
2004	Henry Wanyoike	Athletics	Catherine Ndereba	Athletics	
2005	Benjamin Limo	Athletics	Catherine Ndereba (2)	Athletics	
2006	Alex Kipchirchir	Athletics	Janeth Jepkosgei	Athletics	
2007	Jason Dunford	Swimming	Janeth Jepkosgei (2)	Athletics	
2008	Samuel Wanjiru	Athletics	Pamela Jelimo	Athletics	
2009	Collins Injera	Rugby union	Linet Masai	Athletics	
2010	David Rudisha	Athletics	Nancy Lagat	Athletics	
2011	Patrick Makau	Athletics	Vivian Cheruiyot	Athletics	
2012	David Rudisha (2)	Athletics	Mary Keitany	Athletics	
2013	Ezekiel Kemboi	Athletics	Edna Kiplagat	Athletics	
2014	Caleb Ndiku	Athletics	Eunice Sum	Athletics	
2015	Julius Yego	Athletics	Hyvin Kiyeng	Athletics	
2016	Eliud Kipchoge	Athletics	Vivian Cheruiyot (2)	Athletics	
2017	Conseslus Kipruto	Athletics	Hellen Obiri	Athletics	
2018	Eliud Kipchoge (2)	Athletics	Beatrice Chepkoech	Athletics	
2019	Eliud Kipchoge (3)	Athletics	Hellen Obiri (2)	Athletics	
2021	Ferdinand Omanyala	Athletics	Faith Kipyegon	Athletics	
2022	Eliud Kipchoge (4)	Athletics	Faith Kipyegon (2)	Athletics	
2023	Kelvin Kiptum	Athletics	Faith Kipyegon (3)	Athletics	
2024	Emmanuel Wanyonyi	Athletics	Beatrice Chebet	Athletics	
2024	Emmanuel Wanyonyi (2)	Athletics	Beatrice Chebet (2)	Athletics	

== See also ==
- Kenya national athletics team
