= Zambia at the 2020 Summer Paralympics =

Sporting event delegation

- IPC code: ZAM
- NPC: National Paralympic Committee of Zambia

in Tokyo
- Competitors: 1 in 1 sport
- Medals: Gold 0 Silver 0 Bronze 0 Total 0

Summer Paralympics appearances (overview)
- 1996; 2000; 2004; 2008; 2012; 2016; 2020; 2024

Zambia competed at the 2020 Summer Paralympics in Tokyo, Japan, from 24 August to 5 September 2021.

== Athletics ==
| Athlete | Event | Heats | | Final | |
| Athlete | Event | Result | Rank | Result | Rank |
|---|---|---|---|---|---|
| Monica Munga | 400 metres | 1:05.79 | 5 | Did not advance | |

== See also ==
- Zambia at the 2020 Summer Olympics
