= Zambia at the 2008 Summer Paralympics =

- IPC code: ZAM
- NPC: National Paralympic Committee of Zambia

in Beijing
- Competitors: 1 in 1 sport
- Medals: Gold 0 Silver 0 Bronze 0 Total 0

Summer Paralympics appearances (overview)
- 1996; 2000; 2004; 2008; 2012; 2016; 2020; 2024

Zambia competed in the 2008 Summer Paralympics in Beijing, China. The country's delegation consisted of a single athlete, middle-distance runner Larson Katongo. The 21-year-old Katongo, who is visually impaired, participated in the 800 metre and 1500 metre events. Although he had competed in international meets before, this was his first Paralympic Games. Katongo's trainer is Paul Mwansa.

== Athletics ==
Men

Athlete	Class	Event	Heats		Semifinal		Final		
Athlete	Class	Event	Result	Rank	Result	Rank	Result	Points	Rank
Lassam Katongo	T12	800 m	2:09.03	4	did not advance				
Lassam Katongo	T13	1500 m	4:28.80	5	did not advance				

== See also ==
- 2008 Summer Paralympics
- Zambia at the Paralympics
- Zambia at the 2008 Summer Olympics
