= Zambia at the 2000 Summer Paralympics =

- IPC code: ZAM
- NPC: National Paralympic Committee of Zambia

in Sydney
- Competitors: 2 in 1 sport
- Medals: Gold 0 Silver 0 Bronze 0 Total 0

Summer Paralympics appearances (overview)
- 1996; 2000; 2004; 2008; 2012; 2016; 2020; 2024

Zambia competed at the 2000 Summer Paralympics in Sydney, Australia. It was the country's second participation in the Paralympic Games. Wheelchair athlete Lango Sinkamba, who had competed in the 2000 Games, took part for the second time, entering the marathon. Visually impaired sprinter Nancy Kalaba, Zambia's only other representative, made her Paralympic début, in the 100m race. Neither of them won a medal.

== Athletics ==
Sinkamba, in the marathon, improved on his time from the 1996 Games, but by crossing the finish line in 2:51:55 he was once more last of the finishers. Kalaba finished last of her heat—her time of 15.88 was almost two seconds slower than the second-slowest overall in the heats.

Name	Sport	Event	Score	Rank
Nancy Kalaba	Athletics	Women's 100m T12	15.88 (heat 2)	4th; did not advance
Lango Sinkamba	Athletics	Men's Marathon T54	2:51:55	45th (last of those who completed the race)

== See also ==
- Zambia at the Paralympics
- Zambia at the 2000 Summer Olympics
