= Naom Wafula =

Kenyan golfer

Naom Angella Wafula, more commonly known as Naomi Wafula (born c. 1999) is a Kenyan professional golfer. Wafula is known for being the first Kenyan golfer to make the cut in a Ladies European Tour event, and is the first woman to make the cut on the Safari Tour. In 2024, she became the first woman to win the Kenya Amateur Golf Championship, She is also the first female professional golfer under the Professional Golfers of Kenya.

== Biography ==
Wafula was born in Kitale, the daughter of a single mother. At three years old, Wafula was adopted by her aunt, Kenyan professional golfer, Rose Naliaka, after her mother Rose Nanjala Titus could not afford to care for her. Wafula moved to Nairobi, where she would follow her aunt to training and picked up the sport at six years old. She was inspired by watching Naliaka play.

In Nairobi, Wafula distinguished herself as a player early. In 2011 she became the youngest Kenyan woman to make the Ladies National golf team, at age 13. She would be part of the winning team contesting the Gilbertson and Page Trophy. That year, she was named the "Most Promising Sports Personality of the Year" in the Women's category at the Safaricom Sports Personality of the Year Awards.

In 2013 at age 15, Wafula won several top events, including the KLGU Chairman's Cup, the KLGU Amateur Strokeplay, Limuru Ladies Open, Sigona Ladies Open and the Kenya Amateur Ladies Matchplay. She would be named the Kenya Ladies Golf Union's Player of the Year. She additionally led the Kenyan women's team at the Ladies' Coast Open Championship. That year, she finished third at the Kenya Ladies Open. She In 2014, she was invited to participate at the U.S. Kids Golf Teen World Championships in Pinehurst, North Carolina, but had to withdraw over lack of sponsorship.

In 2016, Wafula returned to her mother's home village of Kitale and started a small food business. There, she supported her golf training by "cooking and selling chips in my village". She continued to play golf and looked for sponsors. In 2018, Wafula was part of the winning team of the 2018 Kenya Open Ladies Strokeplay event.

In 2019, Wafula played in her first event on the Ladies European Tour, the Magical Kenya Ladies Open. In 2020 at age 22, Wafula made history becoming the first woman golfer to make the cut on the Safari Tour at Sigona Golf Club. She was in eighth place in the event after day 2. That year, she was named Kenya's top female junior amateur player. In 2021, she was named the Kenya Ladies Golf Union's 2021 Golfer of the Year.

In 2022, Wafula won the Karen Ladies Open Tournament. Later that year, she was invited by the Ladies European Tour to play in the Amundi German Masters competition in Berlin. Wafula missed the cut by six shots, but distinguished herself in the competition by scoring lower than some of the professional players on the tour. She finished the event in 102nd position.

In 2023, Wafula played in the Magical Kenya Ladies Open and became the first Kenyan to make the cut in a Ladies European Tour event. She finished the event in 56th position. That year, Wafula was invited once again to play in the Amundi German Masters competition. Wafula would place 113th in the event. That summer she would play in several Ladies European Tour events in Europe, including Sweden's Capio Ogon Trophy, the LETAS Links Series in England and the Smorum Ladies Open in Denmark. In November, she became the first woman to win the Kenya Amateur Golf Championship title, winning in dramatic fashion in a sudden death playoff.

In 2024, Wafula again played in the Magical Kenya Ladies Open held at her home club, Vipingo Ridge. Later that year, Wafula won the Kenya Amateur Match Play Championship title. That December, Wafula was part of the Kenyan ladies golf team to be awarded bronze at the All Africa Challenge Trophy event in Morocco. Wafula came in seventh in the individual competition. In 2024, Wafula competed in 19 events, placing in the top 10 in 10 of them. Some of these events were Men's events.

In 2025, Wafula distinguished herself in the Sunshine Development Tour's East Africa Swing event, a men's competition. Wafula was the only woman to make the cut, and was one of only five amateurs to do so.

== Amateur wins ==
- 2023 Kiambu Open
- 2024 Coronation Cup, Kenya Ladies Open Amateur Match Play Championship

== Team events representing Kenya ==
- 2011 Gilbertson and Page Trophy (winners)
- 2013 Gilbertson and Page Trophy (winners)
- 2014 African Youth Games (silver)
- 2015 Gilbertson and Page Trophy (winners)
- 2020 Gilbertson and Page Trophy (winners)
- 2024 Africa Amateur Women's Invitational
- 2024 All Africa Challenge Trophy (third place)
