= National Paralympic Committee of Ghana =

Ghana Paralympic Committee
National Paralympic Committee
- Country: Ghana
- Code: GHA
- Continental association: APC
- Headquarters: Accra, Ghana
- President: Samson Deen

The Ghana Paralympic Committee is the National Paralympic Committee in Ghana for the Paralympic Games movement. It is a non-profit organisation that selects teams, and raises funds to send Ghanaian competitors to Paralympic events organised by the International Paralympic Committee (IPC).

== See also ==
- Ghana at the Paralympics
