= African Para Games =

Sports event for athletes from African nations

- Purpose: Multi-sport event for athletes with physical disabilities from nations on the African continent
- Frequency: Every 4 years
- Inaugurated: 2023 African Para Games in Accra, Ghana
- Most recent: 2023 African Para Games in Accra, Ghana
- Next event: 2027 African Para Games in Cairo, Egypt

The African Para Games is a multi-sport event contested by para-athletes from African nations.

== History ==
The General Assembly of the African Paralympic Committee (AfPC) in 2021 in Rabat, Morocco, elected and endorsed Ghana to host and organize the first African Para Games. Pursuance to the decision in 2017 by the AfPC General Assembly to have a stand-alone multi-para sports event for persons with disabilities and an impairment in Africa.

The first edition of the African Para Games was announced by International Paralympic Committee president Andrew Parsons, in January 2022 during a visit to Ghana, the host country of the 2023 African Games.

== List of African Para Games ==
Host cities of the African Para Games

Edition	Year	Host city	Host nation	Opened by (Note: Names & offices in italics reflect an opener who was not head of state when opening the Games. If the office is partially italicized, the non-italicized portion is the office & name of the head of state being represented.)	Start Date	End Date	Nations	Competitors	Sports	Events	Top Placed Team	Ref.
1	2023	Accra	Ghana	Mustapha Ussif (Note: Minister for Youth and Sports, representing Nana Akufo-Addo, President of Ghana.)	3 September	12 September	18	400	3	7	Morocco (MAR)	
2	2027	Cairo	Egypt									

== Sports ==
Three sports were played at the inaugural game, with five or six planned for 2027. The sports contested or planned to be contested at the African Para Games are; Para Athletics, Para powerlifting, Para Taekwondo, Wheelchair Tennis, Wheelchair Basketball, Goalball, Sitting Volleyball, Amputee football, and Blind football.

Number	Event	2023	2027
Team Sports
1	Wheelchair basketball	Yes	
2	Amputee football	Yes	
Racket Sports
3	Wheelchair tennis	Yes	

== See also ==
- African Paralympic Committee
- African Games
- Paralympic Games
  - Asian Para Games
  - European Para Championships
  - Parapan American Games
