= Wheelchair basketball at the 2023 African Para Games =

- Venue: Bukom Arena
- Location: Accra, Ghana
- Dates: 4–11 September 2023
- Nations: 12 (M), 8 (W)

Wheelchair basketball at the 2023 African Para Games was held from 4 to 11 September 2023 at the Bukom Arena in Accra, Ghana.

== Participating nations ==
NOC	Men	Women	Total athletes
Algeria	Yes	Yes	
Angola	Yes		
Central African Republic	Yes		
DR Congo	Yes	Yes	
Egypt	Yes		
Ghana	Yes	Yes	
Kenya	Yes	Yes	
Morocco	Yes	Yes	
Nigeria	Yes	Yes	
South Africa	Yes	Yes	
Senegal	Yes		
Uganda	Yes		
Zambia		Yes	
Total: 13 NOCs	12	8	

== Medalists ==
Event	Gold	Silver	Bronze
Men's	Morocco	Algeria	Senegal
Women's	Algeria	South Africa	DR Congo

== Medal standings ==
Rank	Nation	Gold	Silver	Bronze	Total
1	Algeria (ALG)	1	1	0	2
2	Morocco (MAR)	1	0	0	1
3	Egypt (EGY)	0	1	0	1
4	(Democratic Republic of the Congo) DR Congo (COD)	0	0	1	1
4	Senegal (SEN)	0	0	1	1
Totals (5 entries)		2	2	2	6
