= Disability in Zambia =

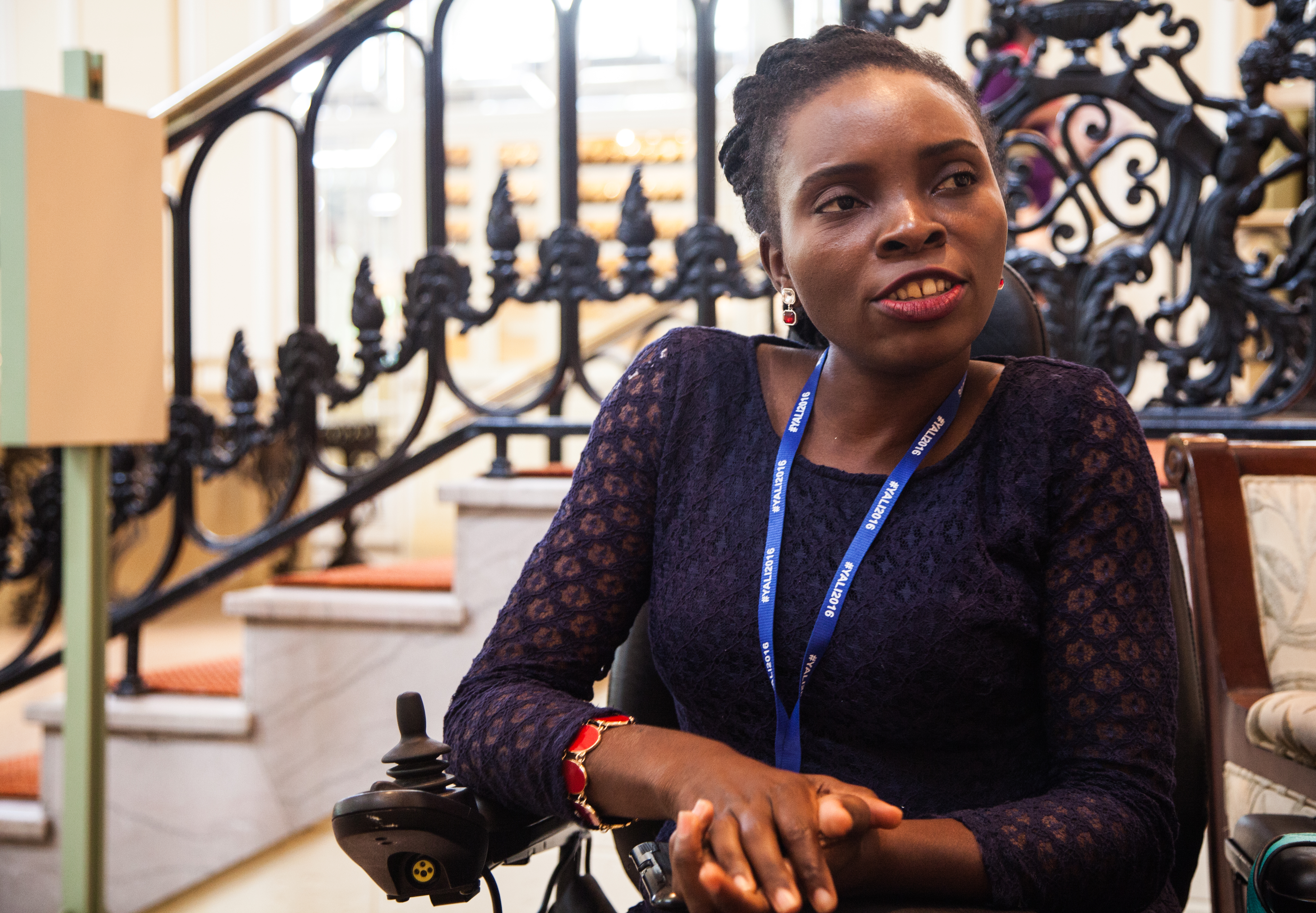
Georgina Mumba, a disability activist from Zambia, at the University of Arizona 2016.

People with disability in Zambia face many unique challenges. The country has been passing laws and policies to help people with disabilities in Zambia, however, social stigma and other factors sometimes interfere in people being able to access services and assistance. In addition, the HIV epidemic in Zambia also has a significant impact on the lives of people with disabilities.

== Demographics ==
As of 2008, it was estimated that around 256,000 in Zambia have a disability in some form and around 5.4% of that number have an intellectual disability. In 2011, it was estimated that the numbers may actually be somewhere between 1 and 2 million people with disability in Zambia. Sixty percent of Zambians live in rural areas where they have limited access to healthcare. People with disabilities have an employment rate of 45.5%, which is lower than the 58% rate for people without disabilities, according to 2005 statistics.

Care-giving roles for people with disabilities in Zambia has shifted to a younger demographic than in previous years. This is in part due to the drop in life expectancy in Zambia.

== Cultural attitudes towards disability ==
In general, people with disability often face social stigma in Zambia. Zambian people with disability can be thought to be the victims of witchcraft by others. Modern Zambian religious beliefs have come to accept and embrace individuals with disabilities over time. Some Zambians attribute a shift to Christianity to the new, more positive, views on people with disability in Zambia. In the workplace, individuals still face discrimination.

Relatives are expected to care for individuals who have a disability. However, there are boarding schools for children with disabilities, and these are often utilized when the children had been orphaned or abandoned. People with disabilities and who are also HIV positive are further marginalized by their communities. People with disability are often expected to rely on charity.

People with disabilities, especially women and those who are HIV positive are assumed to have no sexuality or sex lives by others in Zambia. Disabled women attempting to access health care are often discouraged from visiting health centres, especially for sexual and maternal health needs.

== Policy ==
Disability issues in Zambia fall under the control of the Ministry of Community Development and Social Welfare, now known as the Ministry of Community Development, Mother and Child Health (MCDMCH). However, overall, there is a lack of government support for individuals with disabilities. Individuals who have an intellectual disability cannot receive social welfare benefits. A trust fund, managed by the Zambia Agency for Persons with Disabilities, give out funds to mostly individuals with physical disabilities.

Zambia's Fifth National Development Plan has made some progress in helping people with disabilities in Zambia achieve equal status.

=== Infrastructure ===
Laws requiring ramps for schools and public buildings were passed in 2012. However, many of the ramps that have been built are not suitable for people with physical disabilities. The largest museum in Zambia, the Livingstone Museum, installed a ramp and other accessibility features in 2006.

=== Education ===
The Ministry of Education in Zambia handles special education in the schools. The Technical Education, Vocational and Entrepreneurship Training Authority (TEVETA) is also involved in both education and employment. People with disabilities in Zambia experience difficulty accessing educational opportunities. Special education services have been very limited in Zambia. Parents of children with intellectual disabilities (ID) in Lusaka reported that there were challenges to meeting the social needs of their young adult children.

There have been efforts in Zambia to improve education for people with disabilities. The Persons with Disabilities Act, which mandates that all schools offer inclusive education, was passed by the government in 2012. The Act also created the Zambia Agency for Persons with Disabilities, which offers assistance, including educational opportunities, to people with disabilities. Additionally, a number of non-governmental organisations have been working to increase accessibility to education for Zambians with disabilities. For instance, Special Olympics Zambia offers education, health care, sports training, and competitions for kids and adults with intellectual disabilities.

=== Non Governmental Organisations ===
The first organisation focusing on helping people with disabilities, The Northern Rhodesia Society for the Blind, was formed in 1952.

The Zambia Association for Children and Adults with Learning Disabilities (ZACALD) is one of the most prominent organisations to advocate for individuals with intellectual disabilities in Zambia. The Zambia Agency for Persons with Disabilities (ZAPD) works with the government to advise on policy and advocate for people with disabilities. In addition, the Zambia Federation of Disability Organisations (ZAFOD) has been cited by the Open Society Initiative for Southern Africa (OSISA) as an active and influential organisation in Zambia. ZAFOD advocates for disability rights and promotes teaching issues relating to people with disabilities in tertiary schools in the country.

=== Legislation ===
In 1996, the Zambian government passed the Disability Act of 1996. This act bans discrimination based on disability. This act was repealed in 2012 and replaced with the Persons with Disability Act of 2012. The new act is meant to implement the UN Convention of the Rights of Persons with Disabilities.

In 1998, the Technical Education, Vocational and Entrepreneurship Training (TEVET) Act was passed and a provision considers the needs of people with disability. The Workers' Compensation Act of 1999 changed the law relating to workers' compensation for injuries on the job.

== Unique challenges ==
=== People with disabilities and HIV status ===
Zambia is affected by a generalized HIV epidemic. Individuals with disabilities face unique challenges in getting access to HIV testing and treatment. There is also a lack of information and education available in formats such as Braille, large print or via sign-language interpreters. Children with disabilities also have trouble accessing HIV prevention information. In addition, the social stigma of disability and having HIV means that some individuals prefer to die at home rather than receive treatment for HIV. People who are both HIV positive and have a disability have reported that "they were seen as 'other' and 'less than human' by" health care providers. They report "disability-related stigma that became heightened by the presence of HIV."

Many disabled individuals have reported losing their jobs after discovery of their HIV status has been revealed. These individuals turn to begging for money, which is also frowned upon in most Zambian communities. Those who do have jobs find that it is difficult to take their HIV medications on time outside of the home.

People with disabilities who are also HIV positive are generally assumed to not be engaging in sexual activity, when in fact, they "may be equally as sexually active as others and at increased risk of sexual abuse." Assumptions about their sexuality can impact their health. They have also had their privacy disregarded by health care workers who were shocked to discover a person with disabilities who was also HIV positive: "whenever they find a person with disability who is positive, it becomes a shock to them. They share it with other counsellors, and then it get broken into society."

=== Children with intellectual disabilities ===
Parents of children with intellectual disabilities (ID) in Zambia have found that healthcare professionals do not have an "understanding of their child's condition" and the effects the condition can have on the caregivers.

== Disability culture ==
=== Arts ===
A project to train disabled Zambians in filmmaking was launched in 2016.

=== Sport ===
Disabled sport in Zambia is organised by the National Paralympic Committee of Zambia since its establishment in 2005. As of 2018 Zambia has participated in Summer Paralympic Games in 1996, 2000, 2008, and 2012. They have yet to win any medals.

Special Olympics Zambia has sent teams to the 2007, 2011 and 2015 editions of the Special Olympics World Summer Games.
