= Zambia at the 1996 Summer Paralympics =

- IPC code: ZAM
- NPC: National Paralympic Committee of Zambia

in Atlanta
- Competitors: 1 in 1 sport
- Medals: Gold 0 Silver 0 Bronze 0 Total 0

Summer Paralympics appearances (overview)
- 1996; 2000; 2004; 2008; 2012; 2016; 2020; 2024

Zambia made its Paralympic Games début at the 1996 Summer Paralympics in Atlanta, United States. The country's delegation consisted in a single competitor, wheelchair athlete Lango Sinkamba.

== Athletics ==
Sinkamba had been due to compete in three events, but ultimately withdrew from two of them and focused all his efforts on the marathon. He completed it, but finished 56th and last, over half an hour behind Ecuador's Angel Quevedo in 55th - and more than an hour and a half behind Franz Nietlispach of Switzerland, who took gold and set a Paralympic record with a time of 1:29:44.

Name	Sport	Event	Score	Rank
Lango Sinkamba	Athletics	Men's 1,500m T52-53	scheduled to run in heat 2, but did not start	DNS
Lango Sinkamba	Athletics	Men's 800m T53	scheduled to run in heat 1, but did not start	DNS
Lango Sinkamba	Athletics	Men's Marathon T52-53	3:09:17	56th (last of those who completed the race)

== See also ==
- Zambia at the Paralympics
- Zambia at the 1996 Summer Olympics
