= Jane Ndenga =

Kenyan wheelchair tennis player (born 1977)

- Country (sports): Kenya
- Residence: Nairobi
- Born: 1977 (age 48–49) Siaya, Kenya
- Plays: right

Jane Adhiambo Ndenga (born 1977) is a disability rights campaigner and wheelchair tennis competitor from Kenya. Paralysed from the waist down after suffering from polio, Ndenga has gone on to represent Kenya in the Wheelchair Tennis World Cup and was named Kenyan Sports Personality of the Year with a Disability.

== Biography ==
Jane Ndenga was born in Siaya, Kenya. At age five she contracted polio, and was paralysed from the waist down. Ndenga would go on to have 21 surgeries in an attempt to regain her mobility, none of which were successful.

=== Wheelchair tennis ===
In 2008, Ndenga was introduced to disability sports, taking up wheelchair basketball. She later moved on to sitting volleyball and then to power lifting. Ndenga continued to play all sports until 2012, when she was introduced to the sport of wheelchair tennis, and was named to the Kenyan national team the same year.

In 2013, Ndenga won the Kenya Open in the singles and doubles competition.

Ndenga went on to represent Kenya in the team event at the Wheelchair Tennis World Cup in 2014, 2017 and 2018. In 2018, Ndenga won silver medals in the singles and doubles events in the ITF Wheelchair Futures event.

In 2018, Ndenga was named Sports Personality of the Year with a Disability. That year, she made it to the Africa World Team Cup Qualifying events. In 2019, Ndenga won a silver medal at the Nairobi Open and silver medals in the singles and doubles competitions of the 2020 World Team cup qualifying events.

In 2020, Ndenga captained the Kenyan women's wheelchair tennis team as they campaigned a difficult path to represent Kenya at the 2021 Paralympic games. In 2021, Ndenga led the Kenyan women's wheelchair tennis team to Paralympic qualifiers in Portugal that were moved due to the COVID-19 pandemic. When competing in Portugal, the Kenyan wheelchair tennis team was stymied by the lack of advanced wheelchairs to use in the competition.

In 2021, she reached a career high world ranking of 67 in singles competition. The following year, she won the Rwandan Open. In 2023, Ndenga won the Nairobi Open 11 Futures singles event and won a silver medal in the doubles competition at the 2023 African Para Games. In November 2023, she reached a career high of 70 in the world for doubles competition. The following year, she led the Kenyan team to the Wheelchair Tennis World Team Cup African qualifiers in Abuja.

In 2023, Ndenga was awarded the Order of the Grand Warrior by Kenyan president William Ruto.

In addition to her presence on the court, Ndenga has served as a board member for Tennis Kenya, and has represented the sport of wheelchair tennis at the International Tennis Federation of Africa and the ITF Wheelchair Council. Ndenga additional serves on the board of the Kenya National Paralympic Committee.

=== Disability rights advocacy ===
Ndenga started a non-profit organisation, Disabled Inclusion Node Association to advocate for others with disabilities. She additionally has served as the CEO of the Disabled Empowerment Society of Kenya. Ndenga is a board member of Action Network for the Disabled (ANDY) a social disability non-profit advocating for access to employment for disabled people.
