= Chanelle Wangari =

Kenyan golfer (born c. 2007)

Chanelle Wangari Mwangi (born c. 2007) is a Kenyan amateur golfer. A standout junior player, Wangari made her international competitive debut at age seven, and by age 11 was ranked Africa's top junior golfer. At age seven, she became the first non-handicapped junior golf competitor from Kenya to win an international event.

== Biography ==
Wangari was born in Nairobi and was first exposed to golf while at school. After returning home, she asked her parents to buy her a set of clubs, which they supported, despite never playing the game before. Not long after obtaining a junior golf membership, Wangari began to be noticed for her golf skills at a young age.

=== International competition ===
In 2014 at age 7, Wangari represented Kenya internationally when she competed in South Africa at the Africa Junior Golf Championships. After winning in the under 10 category, she qualified for the 2015 World Junior Golf Championship and the European Junior Golf Tour Challenge. With her win, she became the first non-handicapped Kenyan junior golf competitor to win an international event. Her young age put her in hot contention for the Kenyan Sports Personality of the Year awards in the Most Promising category, which she won. That year, Wangari won the 2014 Kiambu Junior Open and in August, Wangari defended her title at the Thika Junior Golf Open Classic event, besting more than 100 contestants in the girls age 6-9 competition.

In 2015, Wangari travelled to the United States to contest the 2015 World Junior Golf Championship in Pinehurst, North Carolina. Wangari finished T40 in the Girls 8 event, the only competitor from Africa. In 2016 she returned to the competition, where she finished T8. That year, she won the top prize at the Vice Chairman's Prize Tournament, an all-ages Kenyan ladies amateur event, at age 10.

In 2018 at age 11, Wangari was ranked as Africa's top junior golfer. That year, she finished T9 and bested 117 other competitors at the World Junior Golf Championship in her age group. Also in 2018, Wangari represented Kenya at the All Africa Junior Challenge in Morocco.

In 2020, Wangari was named to represent Kenya at the Africa Junior Golf championships. The event was later rescheduled to 2022 due to the COVID-19 pandemic. In 2021, she won the Ladies Amateur Match Play event.

In 2022, at 15, Wangari was invited to play in the Ladies European Tour's Magical Kenya Ladies Open, but was unable to play due to injury. After returning to golf, Wangari won the Kenya Ladies Open Amateur Championship. It was her first event after returning to sport. Soon after, Wangari travelled to the United States to compete in the Girl's Junior PGA Championship. She finished in 93rd position. Upon her return, she won the Faldo Series Kenya Championship, and the Coast Open. In May, Wangari won the Windsor Ladies Open event and earned a spot to play in the Junior Open Championship.

In 2023, at age 16, Wangari was invited to take part in the Ladies European Tour's Magical Kenya Ladies Open. Later that year, Wangari returned to the United States to compete in the International Junior Golf Tour National Championship. She placed 4th in the Junior competition. That year, Wangari won a Junior Golf Foundation scholarship to further develop her game.

In 2024, Wangari made her second appearance in the Ladies European Tour's Magical Kenya Ladies Open. That year, she would compete in several events in the United States on the International Junior Golf Tour. That year, she placed 4th in the Africa Women's Amateur Invitational, and was named to represent the Kenyan team at the All Africa Junior Team Championship. The Kenyan team would place 2nd in the competition, and Wangari placed 3rd individually.

In 2025, Wangari again placed 4th in the Africa Women's Amateur Invitational event in South Africa. In June, Wangari placed third at the Ruiru Ladeis Open.

== Amateur wins ==
- 2022 Kenya Ladies Open Amateur Championship, Faldo Series Kenya Championship
- 2025 Limuru Junior Open

== Team appearances representing Kenya ==
- 2022 All Africa Challenge Trophy
- 2023 All Africa Team Championship
- 2024 All Africa Team Championship
