= Thomas Sellers =

Thomas or Tom Sellers may refer to:

- Tom Sellers (athlete), American wheelchair racer
- Tom Sellers (journalist) (1922–2006), American Pulitzer prize-winning journalist from Georgia
- T. J. Sellers (1911-2006), American journalist and publisher from Virginia
- Tom Sellers (d. 1988), American record producer, founder of The Assembled Multitude
- Tom Sellers, fictional character on the 1950s TV series Buckskin

== See also ==
- Thomas Sellors (1902–1987), British surgeon
