= Aditi Ashok =

Indian golfer (born 1998)

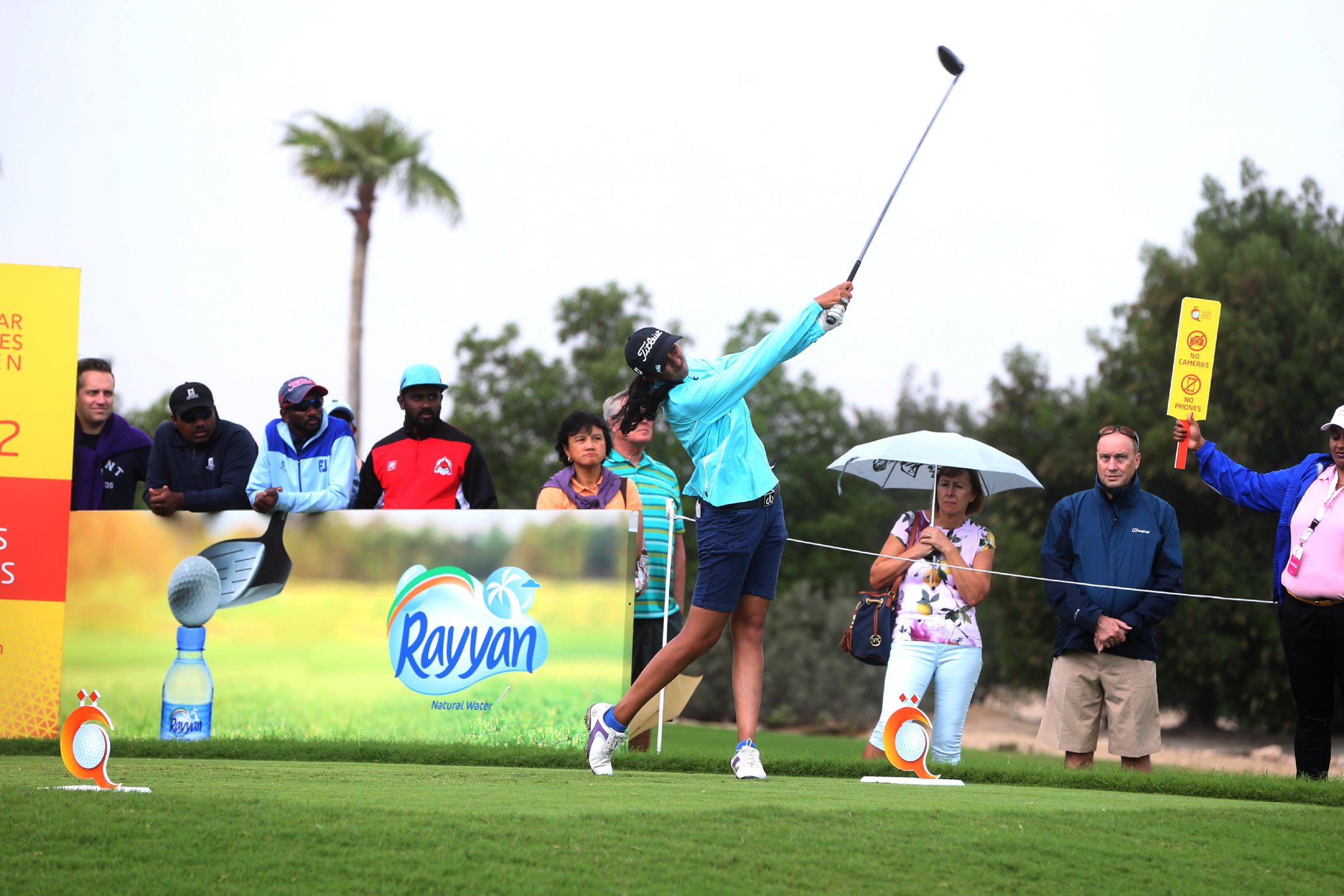
- Aditi at the 2015 Qatar Ladies Open

Personal information
- Nationality: India
- Born: 29 March 1998 (age 28) Bangalore, Karnataka, India
- Height: 1.73 m (5 ft 8 in)

Career
- Sport: Golf
- Turned professional: 2016
- Current tours: Ladies European Tour; LPGA Tour
- Professional wins: 7

Number of wins by tour
- Ladies European Tour: 5
- Other: 2

Best results in LPGA major championships
- Chevron Championship: T42: 2017
- Women's PGA C'ship: T29: 2017
- U.S. Women's Open: T26: 2024
- Women's British Open: T22: 2018
- Evian Championship: T17: 2024

Achievements and awards
- LET Rookie of the Year: 2016
Medal record
Asian Games
Silver medal – second place	2022 Hangzhou	Women's individual
Silver medal – second place	2026 Aichi–Nagoya	Women's team

Aditi Ashok (born 29 March 1998) is an Indian professional golfer. She plays on the Ladies European Tour and LPGA Tour. She made her Olympic Games debut at the 2016 Olympics. She also competed in the 2020 Olympics, where she narrowly missed the podium with a fourth-place finish.

== Early life and amateur career ==
In 1998, Aditi was born in Bangalore, India to Ashok Gudlamani and Maheshwari. When she started playing golf at the age of 5, there were only three golf courses in Bangalore. When she expressed an interest, her parents took her to the Karnataka Golf Association driving range.

Aditi at the age of 12, played in the Asia Pacific Invitation tournament. When Aditi was 13, she became victorious in her first professional tour. She won the National Junior Championship three times in a row: in 2012, 2013, and 2014. In 2014, she held junior and senior titles at the same time. She was the only Indian golfer who played at 2013 Asian Youth Games, 2014 Youth Olympics, and 2014 Asian Games. She won the 2015 Ladies British Amateur Stroke Play Championship. She was educated at The Frank Anthony Public School, Bangalore and graduated in 2016.

Her father, Ashok, was her caddie in the 2016 Olympics; while her mother Maheshwari Ashok was her caddie for the Tokyo 2020 Olympics.

== Professional career ==
In January 2016, she turned pro. She became the youngest and first Indian to win the Lalla Aicha Tour School and secured her Ladies European Tour card for the 2016 season. This win also made her the youngest winner of a Q School for an international tour. At the 2016 Summer Olympics in Rio de Janeiro, Aditi was the youngest participant among all golfers. She finished in 41st place.

Aditi won the 2016 Hero Women's Indian Open with a score of 3-under-par 213, and in the process became the first Indian to win a Ladies European Tour title. In a country normally focused on cricket, her win garnered outsized attention for the sport of golf. Her win made the front page of the country's largest English-language newspaper, the Times of India and she was featured nationally on television. She picked up a second win two weeks later at the Qatar Ladies Open and finished the season second on the Order of Merit. She won the Rookie of the Year award. She also gained a LPGA Tour card for 2017 via the LPGA Final Qualifying Tournament.

In 2017, Aditi became the second LPGA player from India after Simi Mehra and finished eighth in the Louise Suggs Rolex Rookie of the Year standings.

In 2018, she made 17 cuts at 24 events, with two top-10 finishes. She recorded a career-best T-6 result at the Volunteers of America LPGA Texas Classic and tied her career-low score of 64 at the Walmart NW Arkansas Championship. She ended the year with the second-lowest putting average on the LPGA.

In 2019, Aditi made 13 cut out of 22 LPGA Tour events, with best season finish of T13 at CP Women's Open. She ended the year with back-to-back second-place finishes on the Ladies European Tour.

In 2021, Aditi represented India at the 2020 Summer Olympics in the women's individual stroke play event, in which she was ranked 200th in the world. Aditi finished fourth with a score of 269 and 15-under par, two shots behind gold medal winner Nelly Korda of the United States. After 54 holes, she was in the silver medal position, and was in medal contention for most of the fourth round.

== Amateur wins ==
- 2011 USHA Karnataka Junior, Southern India Junior, Faldo Series Asia - India, East India Tolly Ladies, All India Championship
- 2012 USHA Delhi Ladies, USHA Army Championship, All India Junior
- 2013 Asia Pacific Junior Championship
- 2014 Eastern India Ladies Amateur, USHA IGU All India Ladies & Girls Championship
- 2015 Army Ladies & Junior Championship, St Rule Trophy, Southern India Ladies & Junior Girls Championship, Ladies' British Open Amateur Stroke Play Championship, Thailand Amateur Open

== Professional wins (7) ==
=== Ladies European Tour wins (5) ===
No.	Date	Tournament	Winning score	To par	Margin of victory	Runner-up
1	13 Nov 2016	Hero Women's Indian Open	72-69-72=213	−3	1 stroke	(United States) Brittany Lincicome (Spain) Belén Mozo
2	26 Nov 2016	Qatar Ladies Open	70-66-68-69=273	−15	3 strokes	(Wales) Lydia Hall (Sweden) Caroline Hedwall
3	4 Nov 2017	Fatima Bint Mubarak Ladies Open	67-66-68-69=270	−18	1 stroke	(England) Georgia Hall
4	5 Feb 2023	Magical Kenya Ladies Open	67-70-69-74=280	−12	9 strokes	(Thailand) April Angurasaranee (England) Alice Hewson
5	26 Nov 2023	Andalucia Costa Del Sol Open De España	69-68-68-66=271	−17	2 strokes	(Netherlands) Anne Van Dam

=== Other wins (2) ===
- 2011 Hero Professional Tour Leg 1, Hero Professional Tour Leg 3 (both as an amateur)

== Playoff record ==
LPGA Tour playoff record (0–1)

No.	Year	Tournament	Opponent(s)	Result
1	2023	JM Eagle LA Championship	(Australia) Hannah Green (China) Lin Xiyu	Green won with par on second extra hole

== Results in LPGA majors ==
Results not in chronological order.

Tournament	2016	2017	2018	2019	2020	2021	2022	2023	2024	2025	2026
Chevron Championship		T42	CUT	CUT		T67	T71		T62	T62	CUT
U.S. Women's Open		CUT		T39				T33	T26		
Women's PGA Championship		T29	T63	CUT		CUT	T40	76	T35	CUT	CUT
Evian Championship		CUT	CUT	69	NT	CUT	CUT	T42	T17	T28	56
Women's British Open	CUT	CUT	T22		CUT	CUT	CUT	T40	CUT		CUT

Did not play

CUT = missed the half-way cut
NT = no tournament
T = tied

=== Summary ===
Tournament	Wins	2nd	3rd	Top-5	Top-10	Top-25	Events	Cuts made
Chevron Championship	0	0	0	0	0	0	8	5
U.S. Women's Open	0	0	0	0	0	0	4	3
Women's PGA Championship	0	0	0	0	0	0	9	5
The Evian Championship	0	0	0	0	0	1	9	5
Women's British Open	0	0	0	0	0	1	9	2
Totals	0	0	0	0	0	2	39	20

- Most consecutive cuts made – 8 (2023 Women's PGA – 2024 Evian)

== World ranking ==
Position in Women's World Golf Rankings at the end of each calendar year.

Year	Ranking	Source
2013	613	
2014	540	
2015	469	
2016	111	
2017	82	
2018	99	
2019	143	
2020	172	
2021	126	
2022	193	
2023	42	
2024	94	
2025	167	

== Team appearances ==
- Espirito Santo Trophy (representing India): 2012, 2014

== Awards and nominations ==
Year	Award	Category	Result	Ref(s)
2024	BBC Awards	Indian Sportswoman of the Year	Nominated	
