= Zambia at the Paralympics =

- IPC code: ZAM
- NPC: National Paralympic Committee of Zambia
- Medals: Gold 0 Silver 0 Bronze 0 Total 0

Summer appearances
- 1996; 2000; 2004; 2008; 2012; 2016; 2020; 2024

Zambia made its Paralympic Games debut at the 1996 Summer Paralympics in Atlanta, with a single athlete (Lango Sinkamba) competing in men's track and field. In 2000, Zambia had two representatives, once more in track and field. The country was absent from the 2004 Games, but sent one representative in 2008.

Zambian athletes have only ever competed in track and field, and have never won a Paralympic medal. Zambia has never participated in the Winter Paralympic Games.

== Full results for Zambia at the Paralympics ==
Name	Games	Sport	Event	Score	Rank
Lango Sinkamba	1996 Atlanta	Athletics	Men's 1,500m T52-53	scheduled to run in heat 2, but did not start	DNS
Lango Sinkamba	1996 Atlanta	Athletics	Men's 800m T53	scheduled to run in heat 1, but did not start	DNS
Lango Sinkamba	1996 Atlanta	Athletics	Men's Marathon T52-53	3:09:17	56th (last of those who completed the race)
Nancy Kalaba	2000 Sydney	Athletics	Women's 100m T12	15.88 (heat 2)	4th; did not advance
Lango Sinkamba	2000 Sydney	Athletics	Men's Marathon T54	2:51:55	45th (last of those who completed the race)
Lassam Katongo	2008 Beijing	Athletics	Men's 1,500m T13	4:28.80 (heat 4)	5th; did not advance
Lassam Katongo	2008 Beijing	Athletics	Men's 800m T12	2:09.03 (heat 3)	4th; did not advance
Lassam Katongo	2012 London	Athletics	Men's 1,500m T13	heat 1	11th; did not advance
Lassam Katongo	2012 London	Athletics	Men's 800m T12	heat 2	3rd; did not advance
Monica Munga	2020 Tokyo	Athletics	Women's 400m T13	heat 2	5th; did not advance
Monica Munga	2024 Paris	Athletics	Women's 400m T13	heat 2	7th; did not advance
Lassam Katongo	2024 Paris	Athletics	Men's 800m T12	heat 1	3rd; did not advance

=== Medals by Summer Games ===
Games	Athletes	Gold	Silver	Bronze	Total	Rank
1996 Atlanta	1	0	0	0	0	-
2000 Sydney	2	0	0	0	0	-
2004 Athens	did not participate					
2008 Beijing	1	0	0	0	0	-
2012 London	1	0	0	0	0	-
2016 Rio de Janeiro	did not participate					
2020 Tokyo	1	0	0	0	0	-
2024 Paris	2	0	0	0	0	-
2028 Los Angeles	Future Event					
2032 Brisbane	Future Event					
Total		0	0	0	0	-

== See also ==
- Zambia at the Olympics
