= Qatar Open =

Qatar Open may refer to the following sports events:

- ATP Qatar Open, a men's tennis tournament
- WTA Qatar Open, a women's tennis tournament
- Qatar Open (table tennis), an ITTF table tennis tournament
- Qatar Ladies Open (golf), a golf event on the Ladies European Tour
