= BBC Indian Sportswoman of the Year =

Sports award

BBC Indian Sportswoman of the Year Award
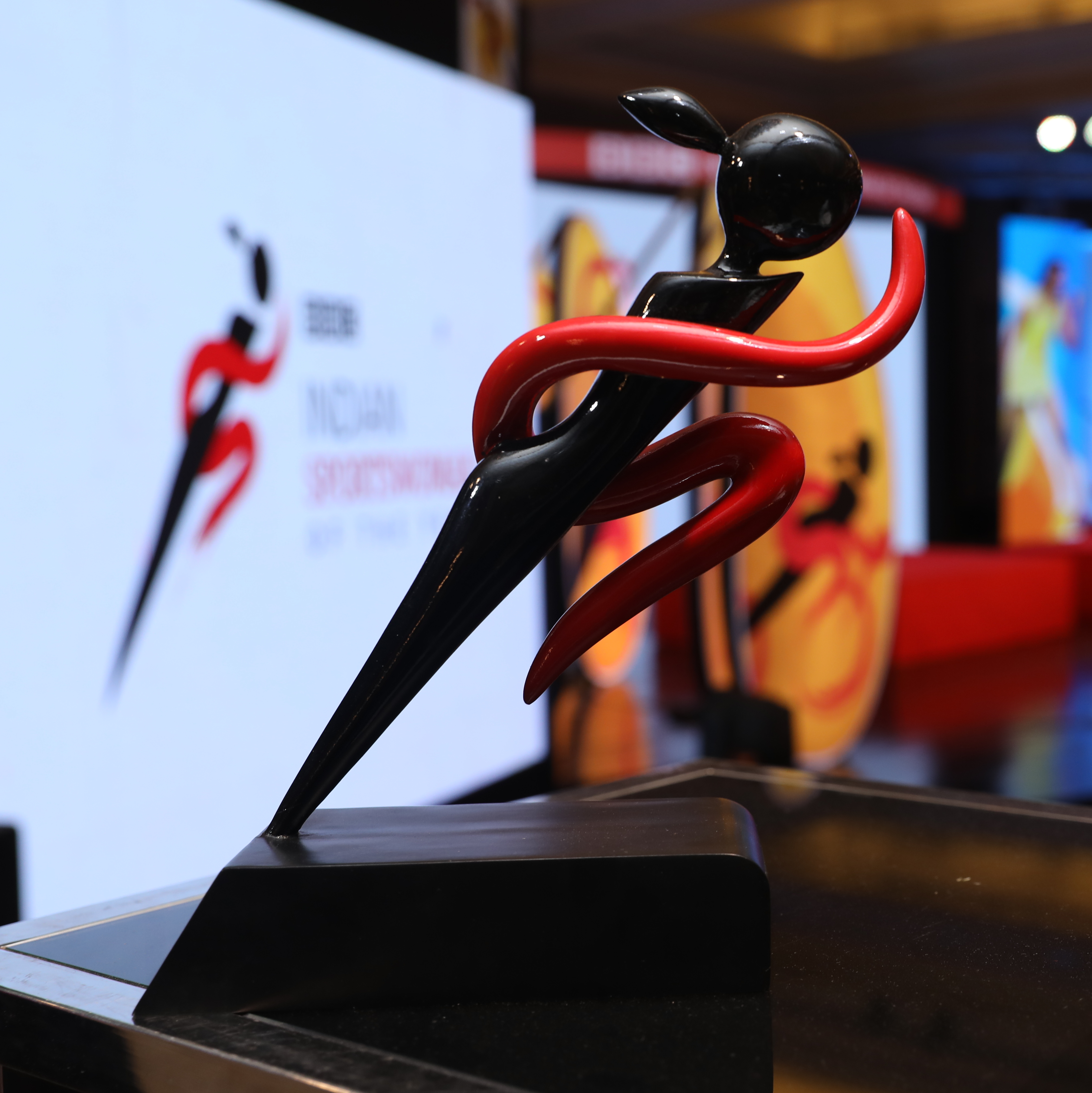
- Awarded for: Excellence in sporting achievement
- Location: Taj Palace Hotel, New Delhi
- Country: India
- Presented by: BBC Hindi
- First award: 8 March 2020; 6 years ago
- Final award: 5 March 2023
- Currently held by: Mirabai Chanu
- Website: www.bbc.com/hindi

The BBC Indian Sportswoman of the Year Award (abbreviated as BBC ISWOTY) is an initiative first announced in December 2019 by BBC Hindi to celebrate and honour sportswomen from India who have excelled in their chosen field of competition. The first edition of the awards took place in March 2020 where badminton star P. V. Sindhu was presented with the inaugural honour. The latest edition of the awards took place in March 2023 with Mirabai Chanu awarded the accolade for the second year in a row.

== Nomination and selection procedure ==
A jury of sports journalists, experts and BBC editors vote on a long-list of fifty Indian sportswomen nominated on the basis of their performance in a 12 month period preceding the year of the award. The five Indian sportswomen who receive the most votes proceed to a public vote. The public can cast their votes via various BBC Indian language websites on which the award is promoted and the BBC Sport website. The shortlisted nominee with the highest number of public votes is declared winner and awarded the title of "BBC Indian Sportswoman of the Year". Only the headline award is selected on the basis of a public vote, with the other three awards being decided by the jury alone.

== First edition (2020) ==
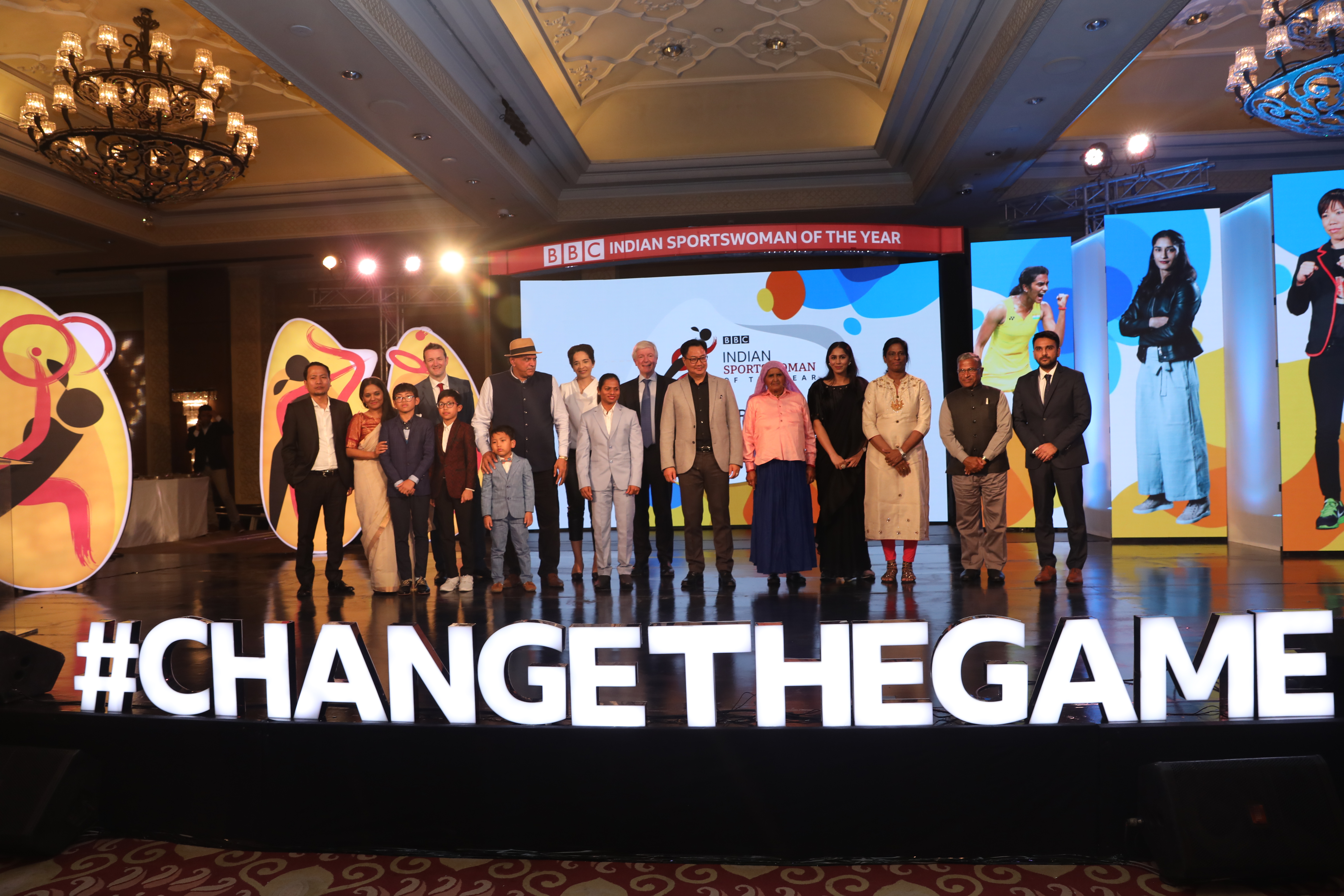
Group photograph of BBC Indian Sportswoman of the Year Award 2020 ceremony

The ISWOTY award was first instituted in 2020. The shortlisted nominees, announced in early February 2020, who proceeded to the public vote were:

- Dutee Chand, sprinter and national 100m champion
- Manasi Joshi, para-badminton world champion
- Mary Kom, Olympic boxer
- Vinesh Phogat, freestyle wrestler
- P. V. Sindhu, badminton world champion

On 8 March 2020, to coincide with International Women’s Day, the BBC announced P. V. Sindhu as Indian Sportswoman of the Year 2019 at a ceremony held in Delhi. Minister of Youth Affairs and Sports (India) Kiren Rijiju was present as the guest of honour at the event. As a part of the program, retired track and field athlete P. T. Usha, was awarded the Lifetime Achievement Award.

First annual awards presented: 8 March 2020. Location: New Delhi
Indian Sportswoman of the Year 2019	Lifetime Achievement Award
P. V. Sindhu (Badminton)	P. T. Usha (Track and Field)

== Second edition (2021) ==
The BBC announced its second edition of ISWOTY on 18 January 2021. Nominees for the second edition of the award were revealed on 8 February that same year. The shortlisted nominees who proceeded to the public vote were:

- Rani Rampal, Indian field hockey team captain
- Vinesh Phogat, freestyle wrestler
- Manu Bhaker, airgun shooter
- Koneru Humpy, world rapid chess champion
- Dutee Chand, sprinter

In a virtual ceremony held on 8 March 2021, the BBC named Koneru Humpy as Indian Sportswoman of the Year 2020. A lifetime achievement award was awarded to former long-jumper and Khel Ratna awardee Anju Bobby George. This edition also marked the introduction of the Emerging Sportswoman of the Year Award which was presented by cricketer Ben Stokes to Manu Bhaker who had also been on the shortlist for the main award.

A sports edit-a-thon was organised as part of the ISWOTY 2021, where journalism students from across the country created/improved articles on Indian sportswomen in various Indic language Wikipedias.

Second annual awards presented: 8 March 2021. Virtual ceremony due to COVID-19. Host: Tim Davie
Indian Sportswoman of the Year 2020	Lifetime Achievement Award	Emerging Player of the Year Award 2020
Koneru Humpy (Chess)	Anju Bobby George (Long jump)	Manu Bhaker (Shooting)

== Third edition (2022) ==
The BBC announced the third edition of ISWOTY on 17 January 2022. The nominations for the third edition of the award were announced on 8 February for five Indian sportswomen who had an outstanding calendar year, from 1 October 2020 to 30 September 2021. The shortlisted nominees who proceeded to the public vote were:

- Aditi Ashok, golfer
- Lovlina Borgohain, boxer
- Mirabai Chanu, weightlifter
- Avani Lekhara, paralympic gold medal winning shooter
- P. V. Sindhu, badminton player

At the awards ceremony held on 28 March 2022, Mirabai Chanu was announced as the BBC Indian Sportswoman of the Year 2021, with cricketer Shafali Verma given the accolade of Emerging Sportswoman of the Year. The Lifetime Achievement Award was presented to former weightlifter and Padma Shri recipient Karnam Malleshwari.

Third annual awards presented: 7 March 2022. Location: New Delhi. Host: Tim Davie
Indian Sportswoman of the Year 2021	Lifetime Achievement Award	Emerging Player of the Year Award 2021
Mirabai Chanu (Weightlifting)	Karnam Malleshwari (Weightlifting)	Shafali Verma (Cricket)

== Fourth edition (2023) ==
The nominations for the fourth edition of the award were announced on 6 February 2023 for five Indian sportswomen who had an outstanding calendar year, from 1 October 2021 to 30 September 2022. The shortlisted nominees who proceeded to the public vote were:

- Sakshee Malikkh, Freestyle wrestler
- Nikhat Zareen, boxer
- Vinesh Phogat, freestyle wrestler,
- Mirabai Chanu, weightlifter
- P. V. Sindhu, badminton player

At the awards ceremony held on 5 March 2023 at the Taj Palace Hotel in New Delhi, Mirabai Chanu was announced as the BBC Indian Sportswoman of the Year for the second year in a row, with boxer Nitu Ghangas given the accolade of Emerging Sportswoman of the Year. The Lifetime Achievement Award was presented to former hockey player / coach and Dronacharya Award recipient Pritam Rani Siwach. This edition marked the introduction of the Indian Para Sportswoman for the Year Award which was presented to Bhavina Patel for her achievements in Table Tennis.

India's Commonwealth gold medal-winning lawn bowls team, composed of Lovely Choubey, Rupa Rani Tirkey, Pinki Singh and Nayanmoni Saikia were also honoured at the ceremony, receiving a special trophy for their historic achievement. Bhagwani Devi and Rambai received Changemaker of the Year awards.

In attendance at the ceremony were Ashok Gehlot, Chief Minister of Rajasthan, Dilip Tirkey, former captain of the India men's national hockey team and current President of Hockey India, Olympic boxing champion Vijender Singh and India's top-ranked table tennis player Manika Batra.

Fourth annual awards presented: 5 March 2023. Location: Taj Palace Hotel, New Delhi
Indian Sportswoman of the Year 2022	Indian Para-sportswoman of the Year 2022
Mirabai Chanu (Weightlifting)	Bhavina Patel (Table Tennis)
Lifetime Achievement Award	Emerging Player of the Year Award 2022
Pritam Rani Siwach (Hockey)	Nitu Ghanghas (Boxing)

== Fifth edition (2024) ==
The nominations for the fifth edition of the award were announced on 16 January 2025 for five Indian sportswomen. The shortlisted nominees who proceeded to the public vote were:

- Aditi Ashok, golfer
- Manu Bhaker, shooter
- Avani Lekhara, shooter
- Smriti Mandhana, cricketer
- Vinesh Phogat, freestyle wrestler

Fourth annual awards presented: 2025. Location: Taj Palace Hotel, New Delhi
Indian Sportswoman of the Year 2024	Indian Para-sportswoman of the Year 2024
Manu Bhaker (Shooter)	Avani Lekhara (Rifle Shooter)
Lifetime Achievement Award	Emerging Player of the Year Award 2024
Mithali Raj (Cricketer)	Sheetal Devi (Para-archer)

== Sixth edition (2025) ==
Sixth annual awards presented: 16 February 2026. Location: Taj Palace Hotel, New Delhi
Indian Sportswoman of the Year 2025	Indian Para-sportswoman of the Year 2025
Smriti Mandhana (Cricketer)	Preethi Pal (Para athlete)
Lifetime Achievement Award	Emerging Player of the Year Award 2025
Anjali Bhagwat (Shooter)	Divya Deshmukh (Chess Grandmaster)

== Winners ==
Edition	Indian Sportswoman of the Year	Sport
First	P. V. Sindhu	Badminton
Second	Koneru Humpy	Chess
Third	Mirabai Chanu	Weightlifting
Fourth	Mirabai Chanu	Weightlifting
Fifth	Manu Bhaker	Shooting
Sixth	Smriti Mandhana	Cricket

== Multiple nominations and wins ==
Sportswoman	Sport	Nominations	Wins
Mirabai Chanu	Weightlifting	2 (2022, 2023)	2
P. V. Sindhu	Badminton	3 (2020, 2022, 2023)	1
Vinesh Phogat	Wrestling	3 (2020, 2021, 2023)	0
Dutee Chand	Track and Field	2 (2020, 2021)	0

== See also ==
- BBC Sports Personality of the Year
- List of sports awards honoring women
