= Fatima Bint Mubarak Ladies Open =

Coordinates: 24.5428°N 54.4390°E

Tournament information
- Location: Abu Dhabi, United Arab Emirates
- Established: 2016
- Course: Saadiyat Beach Golf Club
- Par: 72
- Tour: Ladies European Tour
- Format: Stroke play
- Prize fund: $300,000
- Month played: January

Tournament record score
- Aggregate: 267 Beth Allen (2016)
- To par: −21 as above

Final champion
- (England) Charley Hull
- Location in United Arab Emirates Location in the Middle East

The Fatima Bint Mubarak Ladies Open was a golf tournament on the Ladies European Tour played from 2016 to 2019. It was held at the Saadiyat Beach Golf Club in Abu Dhabi, United Arab Emirates.

The tournament is named after Fatima bint Mubarak Al Ketbi, the third wife of Sheikh Zayed bin Sultan Al Nahyan, founder and inaugural president of the United Arab Emirates.

Beth Allen won the inaugural event on her way to capture the 2016 LET Order of Merit title. Georgia Hall was runner-up in the first two editions, finishing only a stroke behind Aditi Ashok in 2017.

The final installment in 2019 served as season opener and was won by England's Charley Hull in a wire-to-wire victory.

== Winners ==
Year	Winner	Score	To par	Margin of victory	Runner-up	Purse ($)
2019	(England) Charley Hull	67-72-69=208	−8	1 stroke	(Norway) Marianne Skarpnord	300,000
2018	No tournament (moved from November to January)					
2017	(India) Aditi Ashok	67-66-68-69=270	−18	1 stroke	(England) Georgia Hall	550,000
2016	(United States) Beth Allen	66-68-69-64=267	−21	3 strokes	(England) Georgia Hall	550,000
