= 2023 African Para Games =

- Host city: Accra, Ghana
- Motto: Para Sports Inspire a Better Africa
- Nations: 18
- Athletes: 400
- Events: 7 in 3 sports
- Opening: 3 September 2023
- Closing: 12 September 2023
- Opened by: Mustapha Ussif; Minister for Youth and Sports of Ghana
- Closed by: Samson Deen; President of the African Paralympic Committee
- Main venue: Accra Sports Stadium
- Website: https://accra2023apg.com/

The 2023 African Para Games were the first edition of the African Para Games held between 3 and 12 September 2023 in Accra, Ghana.

== Preparations ==
In January 2022, president of the International Paralympic Committee Andrew Parsons visited Ghana in support of the 2023 African Para Games which were also to be held in Accra.

=== Venues ===
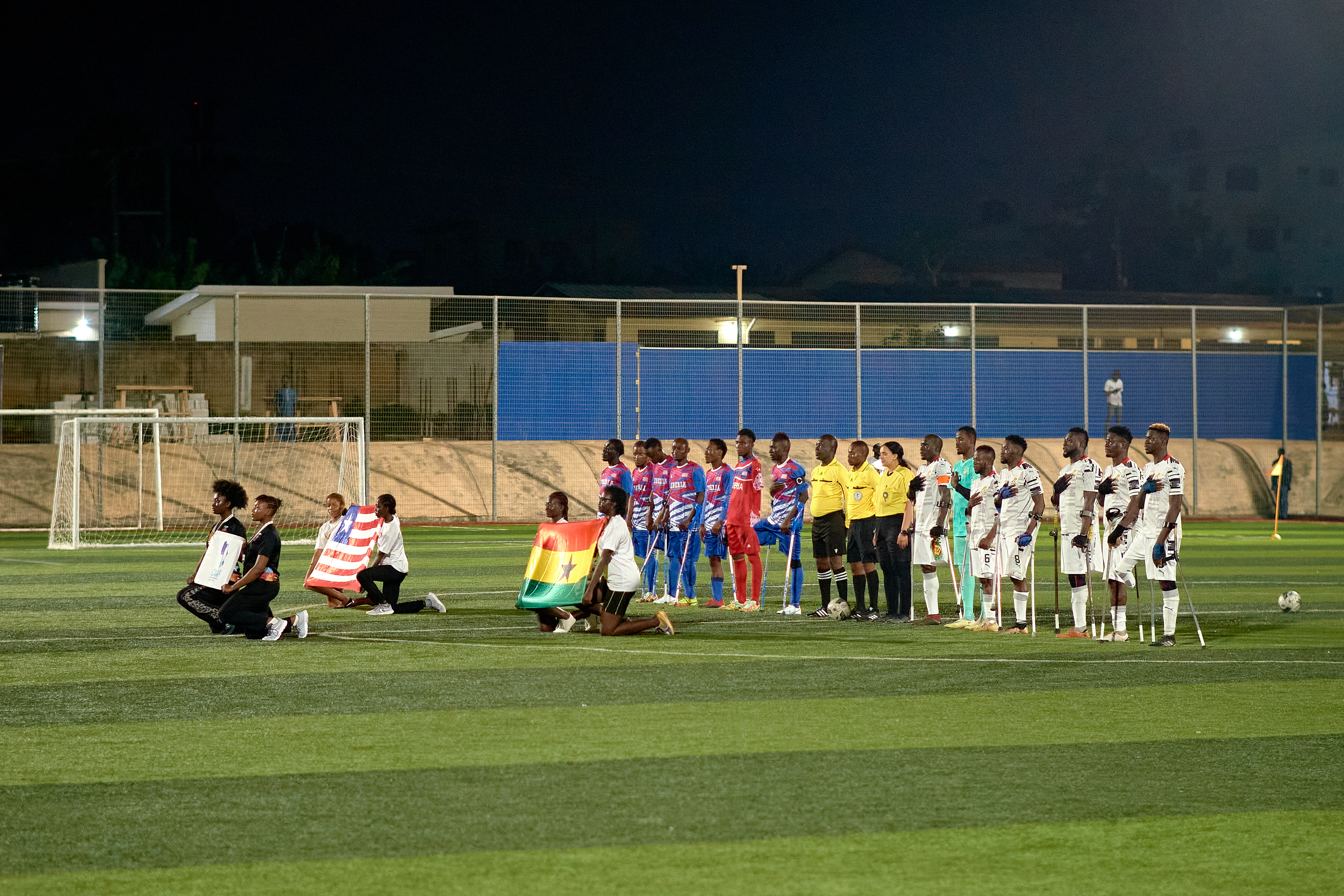
Ghanaian Men's Football Paralympic Team

Amputee football and wheelchair tennis was hosted at the Accra Sports Stadium and wheelchair basketball was hosted at Eden Hights. Para athletics was expected to have taken place at the University of Ghana stadium, however this facility was not completed in time to host the event and the sport was dropped from the programme.

=== Branding ===
==== Logo and motto ====
Official Mascot for the 2023 African Para Game

The logo and motto for the games, Para Sports Inspire a Better Africa, was revealed in November 2022. The games support the IPC #WalkInMyShoe initiative which aims to "break the stigma attached to Para sports" in African nations.

==== Mascot ====
The mascot of the games was an anthropomorphised cocoa bean, wearing a multicoloured Leotard who used a prosthetic leg. The mascot was widely mocked on social media for resembling the children's nursery rhyme character Humpty Dumpty, or the brand mascot of "Nkatie Burger" peanuts or a "Killer Bean".

== Participating nations ==
Initially 36 nations were expected to compete, however, following a series of withdrawals, only 18 actually competed at the games:

Participating National Paralympic Committees
- Algeria (24)
- Angola (24)
- Central African Republic (12)
- Democratic Republic of Congo (24)
- Egypt (26)
- Gambia (1)
- Ghana (40) (host)
- Kenya (40)
- Liberia (12)
- Mali (1)
- Morocco (70)
- Nigeria (28)
- Rwanda (12)
- Senegal (12)
- South Africa (14)
- Tanzania (4)
- Uganda (28)
- Zambia (12)

== Sports ==
Initially seven sports were scheduled to be included in the programme. However due to the failure to meet minimum requirements set by the IPC, only the following three competitions actually took place:

2023 African Para Games Sports Programme
- Amputee football (1)
- Wheelchair basketball (2)
- Wheelchair tennis (4)

== Results ==
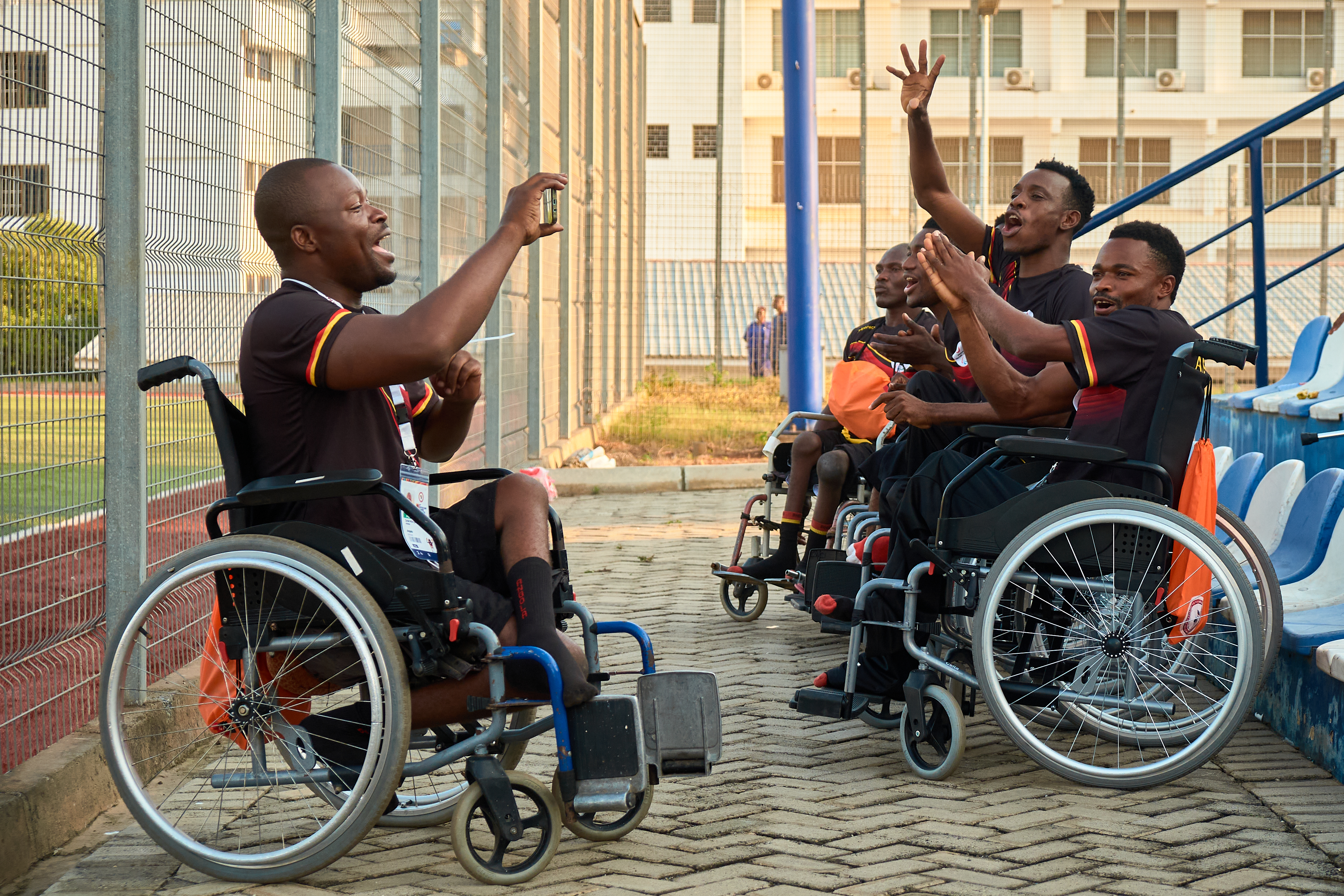
Ugandan Paralympic Games team

=== Wheelchair Tennis ===
1. MS:South Africa,South Africa,Morocco
2. MD:South Africa,Morocco,Egypt
3. WS:Morocco,Morocco,Nigeria
4. WD:Morocco,Kenya,Nigeria

==== Men ====
Singles (RSA) Alwande Sikhosana (RSA) Leon Els (MAR) Lhai Boukartacha

Doubles (RSA) Alwande Sikhosana, Leon Els (MAR) Lhai Bokartacha, Said Himam (EGY) Emad Hassan Salah, Add Elrahman

==== Women ====
Singles (MAR) Najwa Awane (MAR) Samira Benichi (NGR) Omisore Kafayat

Doubles (MAR) Najwa Awane Samira Benichi (KEN) Phoebe Masika Jane Ndenga (NGR) Kafayat Omisore Foluke Habibat Smittu

=== Wheelchair Basketball ===
Men (12):Morocco,Algeria,Senegal

Women (8):Algeria,Egypt,Democratic Republic of the Congo

=== Amputee Football ===
Men (8): Ghana,Morocco,Egypt

Link

== Medals table ==
The medals awarded were as follows:

* Host nation (Ghana)

Rank	Nation	Gold	Silver	Bronze	Total
1	Morocco	3	3	1	7
2	South Africa	2	1	0	3
3	Algeria	1	1	0	2
4	Ghana	1	0	0	1
5	Egypt	0	1	2	3
6	Kenya	0	1	0	1
7	Nigeria	0	0	2	2
8	DR Congo	0	0	1	1
8	Senegal	0	0	1	1
Totals (9 entries)		7	7	7	21

== Concerns and criticisms ==
=== Planning and implementation ===
Initially seven sports were planned to be included in the schedule; amputee football, goalball, para athletics, para powerlifting, sitting volleyball wheelchair basketball and wheelchair tennis. However, following failures by the local organising committee to meet the "minimum required standards" set by the International Paralympic Committee, para Athletics, para Powerlifting and goalball were dropped from the programme in July 2023. Sitting volleyball was also subsequently dropped, resulting on only three sports being included in the programme. Para athletics was expected to have taken place at the University of Ghana stadium, however this facility was not completed in time to host the event.

=== National withdrawals ===
Initially 36 nations were expected to compete. However several nations withdrew in the lead up to the games resulting in only 18 competing.

=== Anti-LGBT+ legislation ===
The Ghanaian parliament is currently considering the anti-LGBT+ bill which seeks to ban the advocation of same-sex relationships and transgender rights. These bill is passed into law carrying the threat of prison sentences of up to ten years for advocating for better rights for LGBT+ people and five years for identifying as LGBT+. The anti-LGBT+ bill have been condemned by the United Nations and the vice-president of the United States.

== See also ==
- 2023 African Games
