= Beth Allen (golfer) =

American professional golfer (born 1981)

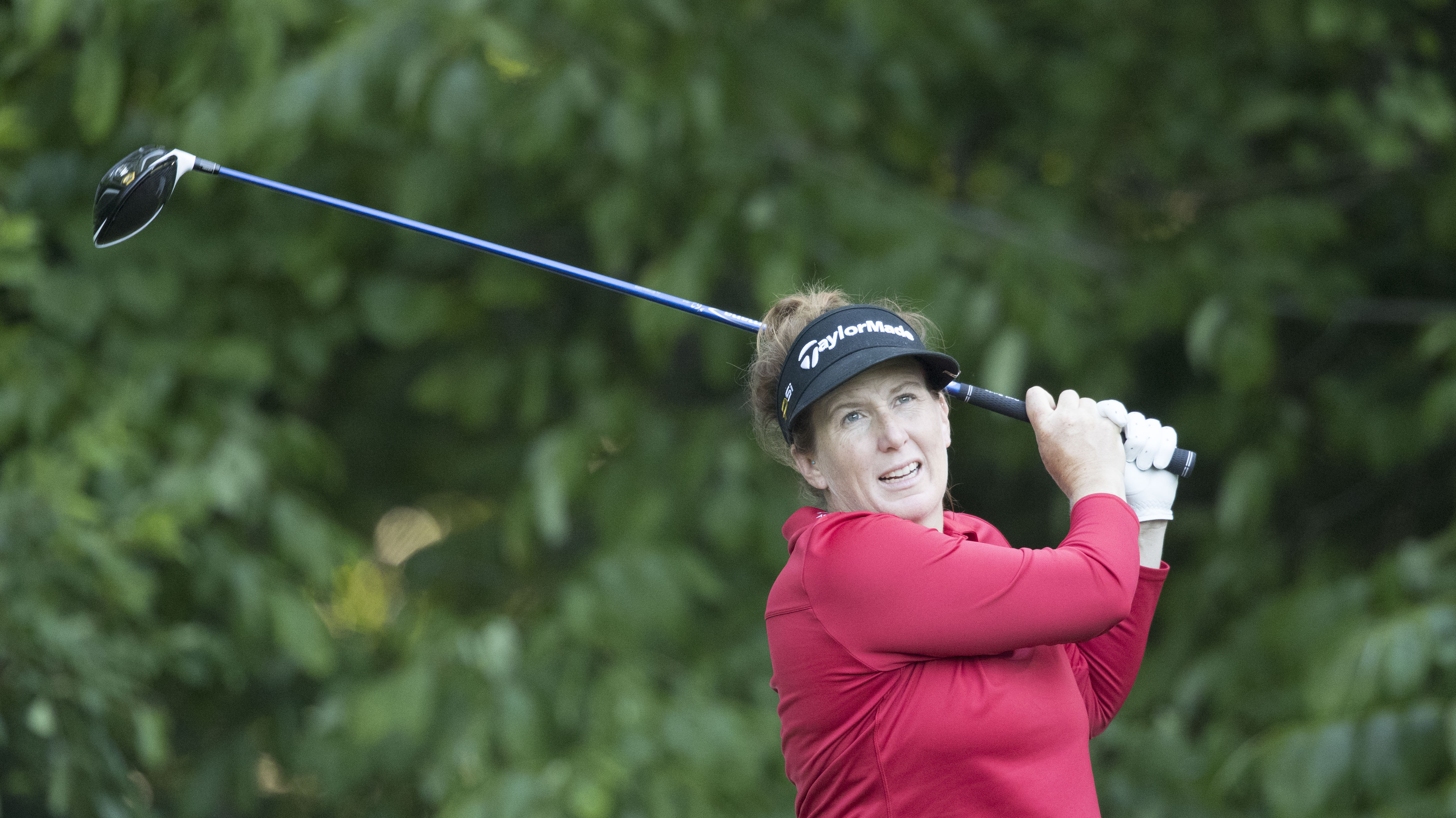

Personal information
- Nationality: United States
- Born: December 6, 1981 (age 44) Ojai, California, U.S.
- Height: 5 ft 5 in (165 cm)

Career
- Sport: Golf
- College: California State University at Northridge
- Turned professional: 2005
- Former tours: LPGA Tour; Ladies European Tour
- Professional wins: 4

Number of wins by tour
- Ladies European Tour: 3
- WPGA Tour of Australasia: 1

Best results in LPGA major championships
- Chevron Championship: CUT: 2017
- Women's PGA C'ship: CUT: 2015, 2017
- U.S. Women's Open: CUT: 2006, 2016, 2017
- Women's British Open: T14: 2016
- Evian Championship: T64: 2015

Achievements and awards
- Ladies European Tour Order of Merit: 2016
- Ladies European Tour Player of the Year: 2016

Beth Allen (born December 6, 1981) is an American professional golfer. She played on the LPGA Tour and the Ladies European Tour (LET). She won three times on the LET and became the first American to win the LET Order of Merit.

== Early life and amateur career ==
Allen grew up in San Diego, California and started to play golf at age 16. She credits her father, PGA Professional Jim Allen, as the most influential individual in her career.

Allen attended California State University at Northridge and became the first from her school to qualify for the LPGA Tour.

== Professional career ==
Allen turned professional after finishing tied for 25th at the 2004 LPGA Final Qualifying Tournament. She played on the LPGA Tour from 2005 to 2008 with a best finish of T23 at the 2006 Wendy's Championship for Children. She played in the 2006 US Women's Open but did not make the cut.

Allen finished sixth at LET Final Qualifying School to qualify for the Ladies European Tour for the 2008 season. In 2009, recorded a career best T3 at the SAS Ladies Masters at Larvik Golfklubb in Norway. In 2010, her season-best finish was T7 at the ABN AMRO Ladies Open in the Netherlands, and she finished T9 at the UNIQA Ladies Golf Open in Austria.

Allen came close to a first title as she was runner-up in the 2011 Open de España Femenino at La Quinta Golf & Country Club, a stroke behind winner Melissa Reid. She also finished runner-up at the 2012 ISPS Handa Ladies British Masters, a stroke behind Lydia Hall, and again at the 2013 Lalla Meryem Cup in Morocco.

In 2015, she won her first LET event at the Ladies European Masters with former European Solheim Cup winner Sophie Gustafson on her bag, a stroke ahead of Irish amateur Leona Maguire in second.

Allen had her best season in 2016. She won the Lacoste Ladies Open de France and the Fatima Bint Mubarak Ladies Open in Abu Dhabi back-to-back, matching the course record of 64 in the final round and holding off Georgia Hall by three strokes. She won the 2016 LET Order of Merit and received the LET Player of the Year award. Allen recorded a T14 at the 2016 Women's British Open at Woburn, her best finish in a major.

She also regained her LPGA Tour card for 2017 via the LPGA Final Qualifying Tournament, where she recorded a season-best of T7 at the ISPS Handa Women's Australian Open.

In 2022, she retired from tour to become the new head coach of the Urban Knights women's golf program at Academy of Art University in San Francisco, California.

== Personal life ==
In March 2011, Allen donated a kidney to her brother who had been suffering with a kidney disorder for 12 years. She returned to compete on the tour just two months later, in May.

Allen resided in Edinburgh, Scotland, after marrying Clare Queen, a former LET player and Scottish Golf's performance director in 2016. She now lives in San Francisco, California.

== Awards and honors ==
- In 2016, Allen was the Ladies European Tour Player of the Year. She also won the Order of Merit.

== Professional wins (4) ==
=== Ladies European Tour wins (3) ===
No.	Date	Tournament	Winning score	To par	Margin of victory	Runner(s)-up
1	5 Jul 2015	Ladies European Masters	71-70-68-67=276	−12	1 stroke	(Republic of Ireland) Leona Maguire (a)
2	9 Oct 2016	Lacoste Ladies Open de France	64-67-68-67=266	−14	4 strokes	(Italy) Diana Luna (England) Florentyna Parker
3	5 Nov 2016	Fatima Bint Mubarak Ladies Open	66-68-69-64=267	−21	3 strokes	(England) Georgia Hall

=== ALPG Tour wins (1) ===
- 2015 Pennant Hills ALPG Pro-Am
