= Tunisian Paralympic Committee =

National Paralympic Committee of Tunisia

National Paralympic Committee
- Country: Tunisia
- Code: TUN
- Created: 1990
- Recognized: 1990
- Continental association: APC
- President: Mohamed Mzoughi
- Secretary General: Ms. Sonia BIDOUH
- Website: www.tunisiaparalympic.org

The Tunisian Paralympic Committee, founded in 1990 and a member of the International Paralympic Committee (IPC), is responsible for the development and management of paralympic sports in Tunisia and it belongs to African Sports Confederation of Disabled.

== Presidents ==
Mohamed Mzoughi

== See also ==
- Tunisia at the Paralympics
