= Rose Naliaka =

Kenyan golfer (born 1955)

Rose Naliaka (born c. 1955) is a former professional golfer and current golf coach from Kenya. Naliaka is distinguished for becoming Kenya's first female professional golfer.

== Biography ==
Naliaka grew up in Kitale and was raised by her grandmother. In 1980, Naliaka took up golf after admiring the makeup case a friend won from a golf competition. Naliaka eagerly took up the sport in an effort to win the same prize. After watching the men play, she modeled their technique, and won five golf balls as a prize. The experience inspired her to continue to learn the sport.

=== Amateur golf ===
At age 28, she decided to become a golfer. After Naliaka started her career as a teacher and administrator, she found a golf course nearby where she could train. It took six months to receive her handicap. Naliaka reportedly did not consider having golf lessons, and was self-taught.

In 1984, less than two years after she first tried to golf, she was selected for the Kenyan National team. Between 1988 and 2004, Naliaka would be named Kenya's Lady Golfer of the year 15 times. In 2001, she won the Uganda Amateur Ladies Open. In 2002, she won the All Africa Challenge Trophy. In 2004, she won the Uganda Ladies Open title for the fourth time.

=== Professional career ===
Naliaka played competitive amateur golf until 2005, when she became a professional player. By that point, she had won most of the country's national competitions, including winning the Kenya Ladies Open seven times. In turning professional, Naliaka became the first female professional golfer in Kenyan history. As a professional, Naliaka became the first Kenyan to play in the Women's World Cup of Golf. Naliaka would go on to be a Dubai Ladies Open champion.

=== Rose Naliaka Golf Academy ===
In 2006, Naliaka founded the Rose Naliaka Foundation and the Rose Naliaka Golf Academy, where she trains the next generation of golfers, and brings the sport to disadvantaged girls. Naliaka was inspired to create the academy, after her two adopted children, Naomi Wafula and Mary Monari, took up the game. Her daughters would follow her mother to the golf course, where Wafula began to play the game at age six. The academy began with two sets of donated clubs by a friend who had worked at the US Embassy in Nairobi. She later limited her professional competition to focus entirely on the Foundation and Academy.

In 2010, Naliaka retired from her career at BBC Monitoring to focus entirely on the Golf Academy. In 2011, she was awarded the Community Hero awards at Kenya's Sports Personality of the Year awards, for her work with the Foundation and Golf Academy. Some of the students she has coached in the Naliaka Academy have gone on to play golf internationally, including Sarah Kanyereri, who plays for St. Thomas University's women's golf team in the United States.

In 2023, Naliaka retired from professional golf, but continues to golf competitively. In January 2025 at age 70, Naliaka won the Nyali Golf and Country Club Chairman's Prize, beating a field of 252 players.
