= Qatar Ladies Open (golf) =

Coordinates: 25.384°N 51.507°E

Tournament information
- Location: Qatar
- Established: 2016
- Course: Doha Golf Club
- Par: 72
- Tour: Ladies European Tour
- Format: Stroke play
- Prize fund: €500,000
- Month played: November
- Final year: 2016

Final champion
- (India) Aditi Ashok
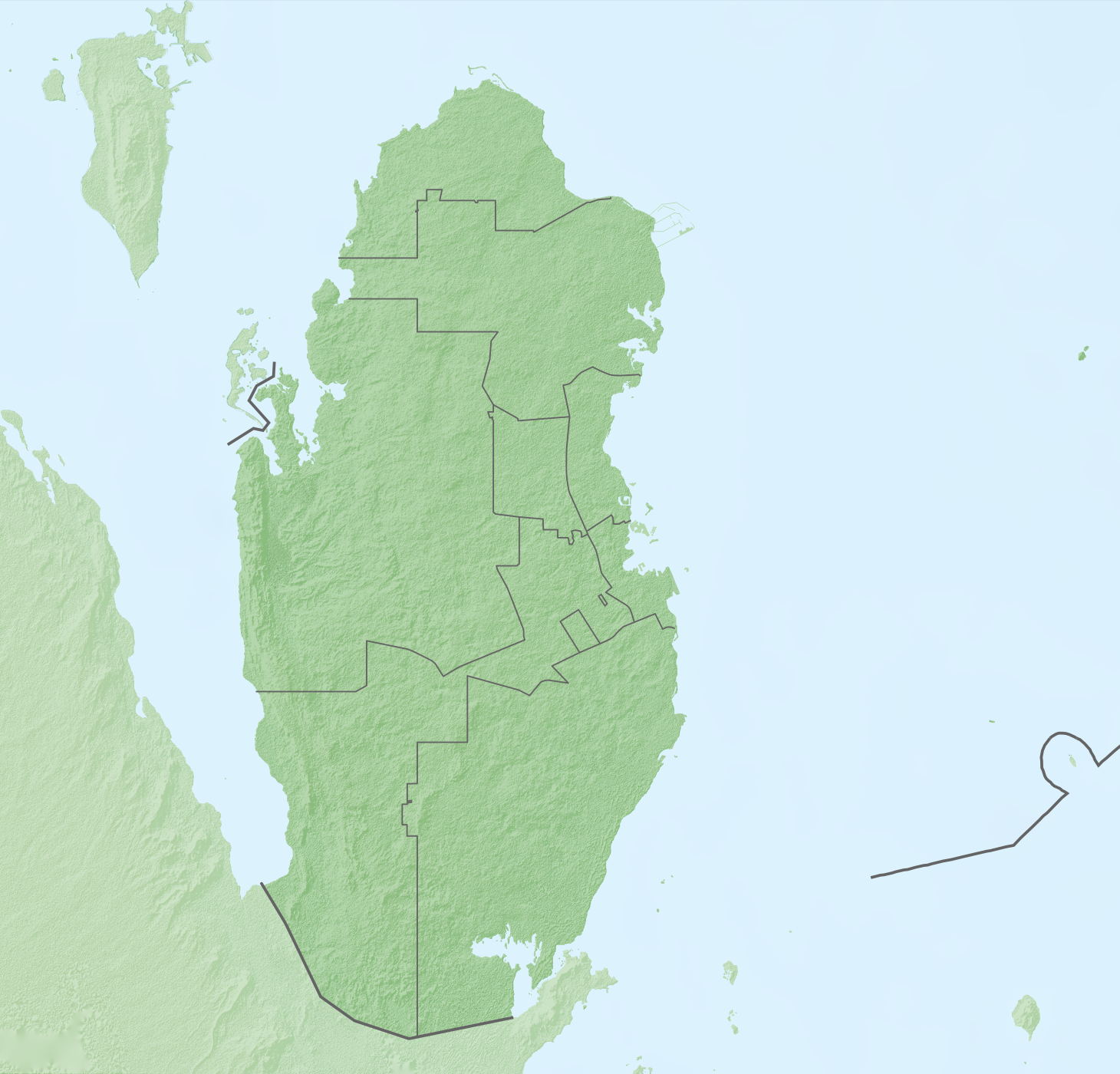
- Location in Middle East Location in Qatar

The Qatar Ladies Open was a golf tournament on the Ladies European Tour only played in 2016. It was held at the Doha Golf Club in Qatar.

== Winners ==
Year	Winner	Country	Score	Margin of victory	Runners-up
2016	Aditi Ashok	India	273 (−15)	3 strokes	(Wales) Lydia Hall (Sweden) Caroline Hedwall
