= Samson Deen =

Ghanaian sports executives and administrator

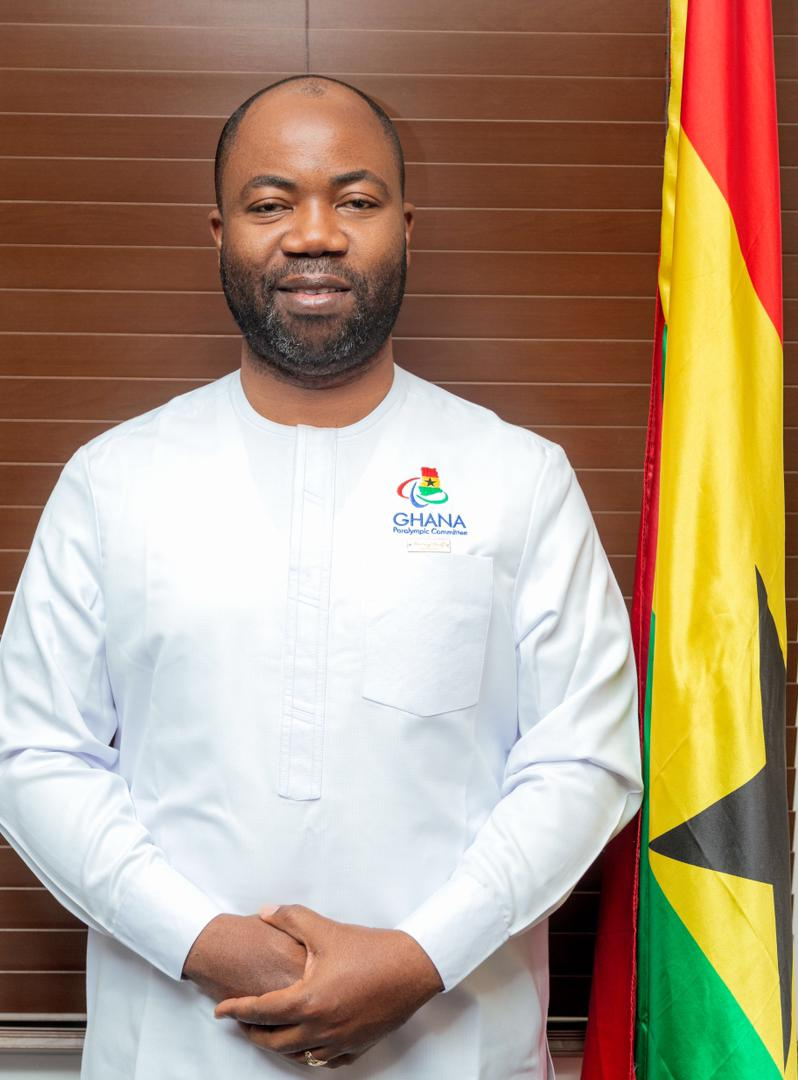

President of the African Paralympic Committee
- In office 2021–present
- Preceded by: First President

Personal details
- Born: Ghana
- Occupation: Hospitality & Sports Management Consultant

Samson Deen is a Ghanaian Hospitality, Communication and Sports Management consultant since 2003 who founded the African Origin Travels and Sports Tourism, AOG Construction Services and African Origin Group of Companies in 2017. He is currently the President of the African Paralympic Committee.

== Career ==
Deen started his professional career in 1999 in different administrative positions with African Vision Movement, an NGO in Liberia and Green Card Solutions in 2001, a US-based company in Ghana. He is the CEO of African Origin Travel & Sports Tourism, a company that won the best company in the Sports Tourism sector for the year 2013 at the National Tourism Awards.

== Sports ==
Deen began his sports journey as the Director of Operations of King Faisal Babes F.C. in the year 2009 to 2012. He was later appointed as a member of the Asante Kotoko S.C. African Cup Committee on 6 June 2012 and again in 2013 to assist in planning and participation of the clubs regional campaign.

Deen was selected as the Head of the Transport Sub Committee of the Local Organizing Committee of the 2023 African Games happening in Ghana in March 2024.

== African Paralympic Committee Presidency ==
He was elected the President of the Ghana Para Powerlifting Association on 9 November 2017 to lead the development of the sports as president. On 6 July 2019, he was later elected as president of the Ghana Paralympic Committee.

On 31 October 2021 he was elected president of the African Paralympic Committee.

As the president of the African Paralympic Committee he presided over the first-ever 2023 African Para Games which was held in Accra, Ghana in 2023.

== Awards and recognition ==
- 2013 Travel and Sports Tourism Entrepreneur of the Year at the Ghana Entrepreneurs Award.
- 2023 West Africa Nations Meritorious Award at the 2023 Sports Writers Association of Ghana(SWAG) awards.
