= Beryl Wamira =

Kenyan athlete

Personal information
- Full name: Beryl Atieno Wamira
- Nationality: Kenyan
- Born: 20 June 1995 (age 31)

Sport
- Country: Kenya
Medal record
Women's Athletics
Representing Kenya
Event / 1st / 2nd / 3rd; Deaflympics / 1 / 2 / 0
Deaflympics
Gold medal – first place	Sofia 2013	200m
Silver medal – second place	Samsun 2017	100m
Silver medal – second place	Samsun 2017	200m

Beryl Atieno Wamira (born 20 June 1995) is a Kenyan female deaf track and field athlete. She competed in the 2013 Summer Deaflympics and in the 2017 Summer Deaflympics representing Kenya. She has won a total of 3 medals in her Deaflympic career including a Junior deaf world record breaking gold medal in the women's 200m event during the 2013 Summer Deaflympics.

She too clinched silver medals in the women's 100m and 200m events at the 2017 Summer Deaflympics. Beryl Wamira currently holds the youth (junior) deaf world records in athletics for women in the 100m, 200m individual events and both of her deaf junior world records were set by her in the 2013 Summer Deaflympics.
