= April Angurasaranee =

Thai professional golfer (born 2004)

Personal information
- Full name: Chanoknan Anugrasaranee
- Nickname: April
- Nationality: Thailand
- Born: 23 April 2004 (age 22) Bangkok, Thailand
- Height: 5 ft 4 in (163 cm)

Career
- Sport: Golf
- Turned professional: 2020
- Current tour: Ladies European Tour (joined 2023)
- Former tours: Epson Tour (joined 2022); Thai LPGA Tour

Chanoknan "April" Anugrasaranee (born 23 April 2004) is a Thai professional golfer on the Ladies European Tour. She turned professional in 2020, when she was 16 years old.

== Career ==
Anugrasaranee started playing golf at 11 years old and turned pro at 16 years old.

In 2022, she played on the Epson Tour where she made four cuts in 15 events, and recorded a season-best finish of tied fourth at the Twin Bridges Championship. She finished as the top female in the Trust Golf Asian Mixed Cup on the Ladies European Tour (LET). Later in the year, the 18-year-old went to LET Q-School at La Manga Club and earned status in Category 16.

Anugrasaranee was runner-up in her first LET event as a member, the 2023 season-opener Magical Kenya Ladies Open. She led the 2023 LET Rookie of the Year race through six events, ultimately finishing 5th.

In 2024, she held the overnight lead in the Joburg Ladies Open at Modderfontein Golf Club before finishing solo 9th.

== Personal life ==
Anugrasaranee was born in Bangkok, Thailand. Her nickname is April because of her birth month. She also has a brother named August because of the same reason.
