= Hardial Singh =

Indian torture victim (1905–1967)

Hardial Singh Bajaj (born 5 April 1905, in Khanqah Dogran, British India; died 18 September 1967, in Singapore) was a notable figure in Southeast Asia of Indian origin. He was the eldest of six children, born to Mehar Singh and Thakur Devi. Bajaj's first marriage was to Kirpal Kaur, with whom he had seven children. Following her death, she expressed a wish for her younger sister to marry Singh.

In 1933, Hardial Singh Bajaj married Milap Kaur, fulfilling the wishes of his first wife, Kirpal Kaur. Together, they had nine children, in addition to the seven children from his first marriage.

Hardial Singh Bajaj settled in Singapore, where he established a significant business enterprise, commonly referred to as the Bajaj Dynasty.

== Career ==
He later moved to Kuala Lumpur, Malaya, where he became a well-known textile merchant. He was associated with several businesses, including Gian Singh & Co., Hardial Singh & Co., and Hardial Singh & Sons. Upon his arrival in Calcutta, India, he was referred to as the "King of Textiles" by The Statesman. Additionally, he was involved in real estate investment and traded in spices and films.

During World War II in Singapore, Hardial Singh Bajaj was imprisoned and tortured by the Imperial Japanese Army Anti-Espionage Department, who suspected him of being a spy. Sardar Singh Chatwal arranged for his special meals and eventual release. It was rumored that Bajaj was considered for knighthood, but this opportunity was allegedly lost due to an incident involving the importation of shirts that violated the Arrow trademark.

In 1945, during World War II, Hardial Singh Bajaj joined the Indian Independence League. He served as a Special Supply Officer for Subhas Chandra Bose. During the war, he was entrusted with sacks of gold, which he later handed over to the Indian Overseas Bank in Singapore. Jawaharlal Nehru subsequently took possession of the gold on behalf of the Indian government.

Source: Narinjan Singh Bajaj, son of Hardial Singh

A Singapore pioneer. President of the Indian Chamber in Singapore from 1949 to 1953. Source: The Straits Times
