= Tom Sellers (athlete) =

American wheelchair racer

Medal record

Representing the United States

Men's athletics

Paralympic Games
Gold medal – first place	1992 Barcelona	4×400 m relay TW3–4

Thomas Sellers (born 1965 or 1966) is an American wheelchair racer who won a gold medal in the 4 × 400 m relay in the 1992 Summer Paralympics in Barcelona, Spain, where he was also the top American finisher in the 800- and 10,000-meter events. He later set a men's wheelchair record at the 1993 Metro-Dade Miami Marathon, completing the course in 1 hour, 47 minutes and 43 seconds, and in 1995 was a U.S. record-holder at the 1500 meter race. He also competed in the Boston Marathon, coming in second in 1994 and third in 1996. He also competed in the 1996 Summer Paralympics in Atlanta, including the Men's marathon T52-53 event. Sellers, of Ormond Beach, Florida, was paralyzed below the waist after a 1986 car accident. Tom Sellers was the first to engineer an aerodynamic wheelchair bucket which is still in use today. He still holds one of the fastest times at the Boston Marathon 12 fastest as of 2018.
