= Lango Sinkamba =

Zambian wheelchair athlete

Lango Sinkamba (born 1968 or 1969) is a Zambian former athlete who specialised in the wheelchair marathon. As a wheelchair athlete, he represented Zambia on two occasions at the Paralympic Games, and was his country's first Paralympian. He subsequently became President of Zambia's National Paralympic Committee, and has been active in raising the profile of disabled sports in his country. He is also an Athlete Ambassador for the international humanitarian organisation Right to Play.

In addition to his efforts in that field, he owns and runs a "small business centre, which deals with computer repairs, software, and office supplies".

== Paralympian ==
Sinkamba lost the full use of both his legs during childhood, as the result of contracting polio. He became involved in disabled sports at a young age, organising wheelchair races while in secondary school.

Zambia first participated in the Paralympic Games in 1996, sending Sinkamba as its sole representative. He was entered in three events in track and field. Opting to focus on the marathon, however, he withdrew from the other two events (the 800m and 1500 m races). He completed the marathon in 3:09:17. He thus came 56th and last among those who finished the race (seven did not), over half an hour behind Ecuador's Angel Quevedo in 55th—and more than an hour and a half behind Franz Nietlispach of Switzerland, who took gold and set a Paralympic record with a time of 1:29:44.

Returning to the Paralympics in 2000, as one of his country's two representatives (along with female visually-impaired sprinter Nancy Kalaba), Sinkamba entered only the marathon. He completed the race again, but finished last once more among the 45 athletes who reached the finish line (four did not). His time of 2:51:55 was an improvement on his previous performance, but remained nineteen minutes slower than the second-slowest competitor (Yevgeniy Tetyukhin of Kazakhstan), and almost an hour and a half behind Franz Nietlispach's winning time of 1:24:55.

In 2004, he urged that, unless he was able to obtain a new wheelchair—which would require a donation, or assistance from the government—, he would be unable to compete in the 2004 Paralympics. Ultimately, he was unable to compete, and Zambia sent no delegation to the Games.

Paralympic results

| Games | Sport | Event | Time | Rank |
|---|---|---|---|---|
| 1996 Atlanta | Athletics | Men's 1,500m T52-53 | scheduled to run in heat 2, but did not start | DNS |
| 1996 Atlanta | Athletics | Men's 800m T53 | scheduled to run in heat 1, but did not start | DNS |
| 1996 Atlanta | Athletics | Men's Marathon T52-53 | 3:09:17 | 56th (last of those who completed the race) |
| 2000 Sydney | Athletics | Men's Marathon T54 | 2:51:55 | 45th (last of those who completed the race) |

== President of the NPCZ ==
Sinkamba did not compete again in the Paralympic Games, but remained active in encouraging Zambian athletes with disabilities—and Zambians with disabilities more generally. As chairman of the Disabled Initiatives Foundation, based in Lusaka, he drew public attention to the everyday difficulties faced by persons with disabilities in a country where little had been done to facilitate their access to public transport, for example. After organising a conference bringing together several associations for disabled persons, in 2002, he called upon the government to "procure goods and services produced by businesses run by the disabled", and to "allocate more money for programmes and services for people with disabilities". He had previously chaired a similar conference, urging the media to "cover the problems of disabled people".

As an athlete, and as Secretary General for the Zambia Paralympic Sports Association, he drew attention to a lack of government financial and material support for Zambian sportspeople with disabilities. Noting the lack of a clear government policy in promoting and facilitating disabled sports, he urged support also from businesses and from the media. His own efforts took the form of participating in a variety of sports committees to speak up for disabled sports.

In 2006, he spoke on the theme of "skills training for people with disability" at an International Labour Office workshop in Lusaka on "Pathways to Decent Work" for persons with disabilities. He emphasised in particular the need for vocational rehabilitation.

In 2005, he became the first President of the newly established National Paralympic Committee of Zambia. As such, he aimed to ensure the training of coaches for athletes with disabilities, to facilitate the forming of sports clubs, to organise disability games, to spot and train young athletes, and to enhance the latter's confidence. By 2008, he was noting the NPCZ's "excellent" relationship with the government, which funded the Committee. He continued, however, to draw attention to the difficulties disabled people faced in accessing public transport, due to poor design and to the fact that passengers in wheelchairs or with guides for the blind were asked to pay extra by private transport providers. He also stated that there remained a "stigma" attached to disability in many people's minds, which he aimed to change by raising the profile of disabled sports.

In 2009, the NPCZ received a donation of fifteen sports wheelchairs from the South African branch of Rotary International. Sinkamba noted that this would help Zambian athletes prepare for the 2012 Summer Paralympics, as well as for the 2011 All-Africa Games (initially due to be hosted in Zambia, until the hosts withdrew due to lack of funds).
