= All Africa Challenge Trophy =

The All Africa Challenge Trophy (abbreviated as AACT) is a biennial continental ladies golf championship in Africa that had its inaugural edition in May 1992.

== History ==
The idea of the tournament was mooted by Tessa Covell, who was then President of the Zambia Ladies' Golf Union with the reasoning that "none of the African countries were realistically able to compete in the World Championships, the Espirito Santo – their golfing standards simply needed a home grown training ground, rotating within the geographical area".

The inaugural edition was held in 1992 in Zimbabwe.

== Format and timeline ==
Initially it was proposed as a biennial event.

Each participating country is represented by three players and a non-playing captain. Using Eisenhower scoring, the best two scores per round count towards the daily team score in the 54-hole stroke play format.

== Hosts and national team winners ==
Year	Host country	Host course	Host union	Dates	Winner
1992	Zimbabwe	Chapman Golf Club, Harare	Zimbabwe Golf Ladies' Union		South Africa
1994	Kenya	Muthaiga Golf Club, Nairobi	Kenya Golf Ladies' Union		South Africa
1996	Nigeria	Ikoyi Club, Lagos	Ladies Golf Association of Nigeria		South Africa
1998	South Africa	Rand Park Club in Johannesburg	Women's' Golf South Africa		South Africa
2000	Uganda	Kitante Golf Course, Kampala	Uganda Ladies Golf Union		South Africa
2002	Cote d’Ivoire	Ivoire Golf Club, Abidjan	Côte d'Ivoire Golf Federation		South Africa
2004	Namibia	Windhoek Golf & Country Club, Windhoek	Namibia Ladies Golf Federation		South Africa
2006	Zambia	Lusaka Golf Course, Lusaka	Zambia Ladies Golf Union	3–7 Jun	Egypt
2008	Egypt	Katamaya Heights Golf & Tennis Resort, Cairo	Egypt Golf Federation	26–31 Aug	South Africa
2010	Nigeria	IBB International Golf & Country Club, Abuja	Ladies Golf Association of Nigeria		
2012	Botswana	Phakalane Golf Estate, Gaborone	Botswana Ladies' Golf Union		
2014	Kenya	Muthaiga Golf Club, Nairobi	Kenya Ladies Golf Union	10–12 Jun	South Africa
2016	Tunisia	Citrus Golf Course, Hammamet	Golf Tunisia Ladies		
2018	Ghana	Achimota Golf Club, Accra	Ghana Ladies' Golf Union	26–31 Aug	South Africa
2020	Namibia	Rossmund Golf Club, Swakopmund	Namibia Golf Federation	30 Mar – 4 Apr	TBD

== Individual winners ==
Year	Winner	Country represented
1992	Gill Tebbutt	South Africa
1994	Wendy Warrington	South Africa
1996	Michelle Burmester	Zimbabwe
1998	Joanne Norton	South Africa
2000	Natu Soro^{1}	Ivory Coast
2002	Rose Naliaka	Kenya
2004	Lumien Lausberg	South Africa
2006	Naella El Attar	Egypt
2008	Monique Smit	South Africa
2010	Henriette Frylink	South Africa
2012	Kim Williams	South Africa
2014	Michaela Fletcher	South Africa
2016	Ivanna Samu	South Africa
2018	Madina Hussein	Tanzania

^{1} Defeated Norah Mbabazi in a playoff
