= African Paralympic Committee =

International regional committee representing Africa

- Formation: April 2010
- Type: Sports federation
- Headquarters: Luanda, Angola
- Members: 49 National Paralympic Committees
- President: Samson Deen (2021-present)
- Website: http://www.africanparalympics.org/

The African Paralympic Committee or the African Sports Confederation of physically challenged persons is an organization based in Luanda, Angola. As of July 2025, its African membership is 49 National Paralympic Committees.

== Member countries ==
In the following table, the year in which the National Paralympic Committee was recognized by the International Paralympic Committee is also given if it is different from the year in which the national committee was created.

Nation	Code	National Paralympic Committee	Created	Ref.
Algeria	ALG	Algerian National Paralympic Committee	1987	
Angola	ANG	Comite Paralímpico Angolano	1994	
Benin	BEN	Federation Handisport du Benin-Comité National Paralympique	1995	
Botswana	BOT	Paralympic Association of Botswana	2000	
Burkina Faso	BUR	National Paralympic Committee of Burkina Faso	1990	
Burundi	BDI	Burundi Paralympic Committee	2007	
Cameroon	CMR	Cameroonian National Paralympic Committee	2011	
Cape Verde	CPV	Comité Desportivo Caboverdiano para Deficientes	1999	
Central African Republic	CAF	Comité National Paralympique Centrafricain	2001	
Comoros	COM	National Paralympic Committee of Comoros		
Republic of the Congo	CGO	Comité National Paralympique Congolais		
Côte d'Ivoire	CIV	Fédération Ivoirienne des Sports Paralympiques		
Democratic Republic of the Congo	COD	National Paralympic Committee of the Democratic Republic of the Congo		
Egypt	EGY	Egyptian Paralympic Committee		
Eritrea	ERI	Eritrean National Paralympic Committee		
Eswatini	SWZ	Eswatini Paralympic Committee		
Ethiopia	ETH	Ethiopian Paralympic Committee		
Gabon	GAB	Federation Gabonaise Omnisports pour Paralympique pour Handicapées		
Gambia	GAM	Gambia Association of the Physically Disabled		
Ghana	GHA	National Paralympic Committee of Ghana		
Guinea	GUI	Guinea Paralympic Committee		
Guinea-Bissau	GBS	Guinea-Bissau Federation of Sports for the Disabled		
Kenya	KEN	Kenya National Paralympic Committee		
Lesotho	LES	National Paralympic Committee of Lesotho		
Liberia	LBR	Liberia National Paralympic Committee		
Libya	LBA	Libyan Paralympic Committee	1981	
Madagascar	MAD	Fédération Malagasy Handisport		
Malawi	MWI	Malawi Paralympic Committee		
Mali	MLI	National Paralympic Committee of Mali		
Mauritius	MRI	Mauritius National Paralympic Committee		
Morocco	MAR	Royal Moroccan Federation of Sports for Disabled		
Mozambique	MOZ	Paralympic Committee Mozambique		
Namibia	NAM	Namibia National Paralympic Committee		
Niger	NIG	Fédération Nigérienne des Sports Paralympiques		
Nigeria	NGR	Nigeria Paralympic Committee		
Rwanda	RWA	National Paralympic Committee of Rwanda		
Sao Tome and Principe	STP	National Paralympic Committee of São Tomé e Principe		
Senegal	SEN	Comité National Provisoire Handisport et Paralympique Sénégalais		
Seychelles	SEY	Paralympic Association of Seychelles		
Sierra Leone	SLE	Sierra Leone Paralympic Committee		
Somalia	SOM	Somali Paralympic Committee		
South Africa	RSA	South African Sports Confederation and Olympic Committee	1991	
South Sudan	SSD	South Sudan Paralympic Committee	2025	
Tanzania	TAN	Tanzania Paralympic Committee		
Togo	TOG	Federation Togolaise de Sports pour Personnes Handicapees		
Tunisia	TUN	Tunisian Paralympic Committee	1990	
Uganda	UGA	Uganda National Paralympic Committee		
Zambia	ZAM	National Paralympic Committee of Zambia	2005	
Zimbabwe	ZIM	Zimbabwe National Paralympic Committee	2010	

== Events ==
African Para Games hosts all Africa's para-athletes for a series of games. The first of its kind was hosted in Accra, Ghana from September 4 to 12, 2023. It hosted participants from 22 African countries.

== See also ==
- Association of National Olympic Committees of Africa
