= Magical Kenya Ladies Open =

Tournament information
- Location: Kikambala, Kenya
- Established: 2019
- Course: Vipingo Ridge
- Par: 73
- Tour: Ladies European Tour
- Format: Stroke play
- Prize fund: €300,000
- Month played: February

Current champion
- (Singapore) Shannon Tan

The Magical Kenya Ladies Open is a professional golf tournament on the Ladies European Tour, first played in 2019.

The tournament is played in Kenya at Vipingo Ridge, near Kikambala in the former Coast Province. It was the last Ladies European Tour event of the 2019 season and marked the first time professional lady golfers played competitively in the region.

In 2022, following a two-year hiatus due to the pandemic, Germany's Esther Henseleit successfully defended her title.

In 2024, Shannon Tan won the tournament in her LET debut to become the first Singaporean to win on the LET.

== Winners ==
Year	Winner	Country	Score	Margin of victory	Winner's share (€)	Runner(s)-up
2024	Shannon Tan	Singapore	280 (−12)	4 strokes	45,000	(Italy) Alessandra Fanali
2023	Aditi Ashok	India	280 (−12)	9 strokes	45,000	(Thailand) April Angurasaranee (England) Alice Hewson
2022	Esther Henseleit	Germany	286 (−2)	1 stroke	45,000	(Spain) Marta Sanz Barrio
2020–2021: No tournament due to the COVID-19 pandemic
2019	Esther Henseleit	Germany	274 (−14)	1 stroke	45,000	(India) Aditi Ashok
