= National Paralympic Committee of Zambia =

National Paralympic Committee
- Country: Zambia
- Code: ZAM
- Created: 2005
- Continental association: APC
- Headquarters: Lusaka
- President: John Kinuna

The National Paralympic Committee of Zambia (NPCZ) is a member of the International Paralympic Committee. It was set up in 2005, replacing the Zambia Sports Federation of the Disabled. Funded by the government, it aims to ensure the training of coaches for athletes with disabilities, to facilitate the forming of sports clubs, to organize disability games, to spot and train young athletes, and to enhance the latter's confidence. Its first president was former wheelchair marathon athlete and Paralympian Lango Sinkamba. Zambia is formally known as the Republic of Zambia and is located in south-central Africa.

Zambia made its Paralympic Games debut in 1996 at the Summer Paralympic Games in Atlanta, Georgia. Only one athlete participated from Zambia, Lango Sinkamba, who competed in men's track and field. Sinkamba did not earn a medal.

In 2000, Zambia sent two representatives who competed in track and field to the Summer Paralympic Games but did not earn any medals. The country did not compete in 2004 but sent another representative in 2008. Zambia has only had representatives compete in track and field events, and have never competed in Winter Paralympic Games.

Sports from western civilization made its way to Zambia in the early 1900s. Boxing, tennis, and basketball are popular but football was the most popular among the rest; football was considered to be Zambia's national sport.

== See also ==
- Zambia at the Paralympics
