= National Paralympic Committee =

National constituent of the Paralympic Movement

A National Paralympic Committee (NPC) is a national organization recognized by the International Paralympic Committee (IPC) as the sole representative of the Paralympic Movement in the NPC's country or territory. NPCs are responsible for organizing their athletes' participation in the Paralympic Games.

== Overview ==
The Paralympic Games are a major international high-performance multi-sport event featuring the world's best athletes with disabilities who have a physical, vision, or intellectual impairment. There are Winter and Summer Paralympic Games, which are held immediately following their respective Olympic Games, in the same host city.

As of July 2025, there are 187 NPCs who are full members of the IPC. Only NPCs in good standing may enter athletes in the Paralympic Games. Within countries, some NPCs serve as the national governing body for one or more sports, while others only act as the IPC member with responsibility for the Paralympic Games.

== List of NPCs by continent ==
There are five regional organizations:

Continent	Association	NPCs
Africa	African Paralympic Committee (AfPC)	49
America	Americas Paralympic Committee (AmPC)	34
Asia	Asian Paralympic Committee (AsPC)	45
Europe	European Paralympic Committee (EPC)	49
Oceania	Oceania Paralympic Committee (OPC)	8

=== Africa ===
Country	National Paralympic Committee
Algeria	Algerian National Paralympic Committee
Angola	Comité Paralímpico Angolano
Benin	Federation Handisport du Benin-Comité National Paralympique
Botswana	Paralympic Association of Botswana
Burkina Faso	National Paralympic Committee Burkina Faso
Burundi	Burundi Paralympic Committee
Cameroon	Cameroonian Paralympic Committee
Cape Verde	Comité Paralímpico de Cabo Verde
Central African Republic	Comité National Paralympique Centrafricain
Comoros	Comité National Paralympic des Comores
Congo	Comité National Paralympique Congolais
DR Congo	Paralympic Committee of the Democratic Republic of Congo
Egypt	Egyptian Paralympic Committee
Eritrea	Eritrean National Paralympic Committee
Eswatini	Eswatini Paralympic Committee
Ethiopia	Ethiopian Paralympic Committee
Gabon	Federation Gabonaise Omnisports pour Paralympique pour Handicapées
Gambia	Gambia Association of the Physically Disabled
Ghana	National Paralympic Committee of Ghana
Guinea	Guinea Paralympic Committee
Guinea-Bissau	Guinea-Bissau Federation of Sports for the Disabled
Ivory Coast	Fédération Ivoirienne des Sports Paralympiques
Kenya	Kenya National Paralympic Committee
Lesotho	National Paralympic Committee of Lesotho
Liberia	Liberia National Paralympic Committee
Libya	Libyan Paralympic Committee
Madagascar	Fédération Malagasy Handisport
Malawi	Malawi Paralympic Committee
Mali	National Paralympic Committee of Mali
Mauritius	Mauritius National Paralympic Committee
Morocco	Royal Moroccan Federation of Sports for Disabled
Mozambique	Paralympic Committee of Mozambique
Namibia	Namibia National Paralympic Committee
Niger	Fédération Nigérienne des Sports Paralympiques
Nigeria	Nigeria Paralympic Committee
Rwanda	National Paralympic Committee of Rwanda
São Tomé and Príncipe	National Paralympic Committee of São Tomé and Príncipe
Senegal	Comité National Provisoire Handisport et Paralympique Sénégalais
Seychelles	Paralympic Association of Seychelles
Sierra Leone	Sierra Leone Paralympic Committee
Somalia	Somali Paralympic Committee
South Africa	South African Sports Confederation and Olympic Committee
South Sudan	South Sudan National Paralympic Committee
Sudan	Sudan National Paralympic Committee
Tanzania	Tanzania Paralympic Committee
Togo	Federation Togolaise de Sports pour Personnes Handicapees
Tunisia	Tunisian Paralympic Committee
Uganda	Uganda National Paralympic Committee
Zambia	National Paralympic Committee of Zambia
Zimbabwe	Zimbabwe Paralympic Committee

=== Americas ===
Country	National Paralympic Committee
Antigua and Barbuda	Antigua and Barbuda Paralympic Committee
Argentina	Argentine Paralympic Committee
Aruba	Aruba Paralympic Committee
Barbados	Paralympic Association of Barbados
Bermuda	Bermuda Paralympic Association
Bolivia	Bolivian Paralympic Committee
Brazil	Brazilian Paralympic Committee
Canada	Canadian Paralympic Committee
Chile	Chile Paralympic Committee
Colombia	Colombian Paralympic Committee
Costa Rica	Comité Paralímpico de Costa Rica
Cuba	Comité Paralímpico Cubano
Dominican Republic	Comité Paralímpico Dominicano
Ecuador	Ecuadorian Paralympic Sport Federation
El Salvador	Comite Paralímpico de El Salvador
Grenada	Grenada Paralympic Committee
Guatemala	Comité Paralímpico Guatemalteco
Guyana	Guyana Paralympic Committee
Haiti	National Paralympic Committee of Haiti
Honduras	Honduran Paralympic Committee
Jamaica	Jamaica Paralympic Association
Mexico	Comité Paralímpico Mexicano
Nicaragua	Comité Paralímpico Nicaragüense
Panama	Comité Paralímpico de Panamá
Paraguay	Paralympic Committee of Paraguay
Peru	National Paralympic Committee Peru
Puerto Rico	Comité Paralímpico de Puerto Rico
Saint Vincent and the Grenadines	National Paralympic Committee St Vincent & the Grenadines
Suriname	National Paralympic Committee of Suriname
Trinidad and Tobago	Trinidad & Tobago Paralympic Committee
United States of America	United States Olympic & Paralympic Committee
Uruguay	Uruguayan Paralympic Committee
U.S. Virgin Islands	National Paralympic Committee US Virgin Islands
Venezuela	Comité Paralímpico Venezolano

=== Asia ===
Country	National Paralympic Committee
Afghanistan	Afghanistan Paralympic Committee
Bahrain	Bahrain Disabled Sports Federation-Bahrain Paralympic Committee
Bangladesh	National Paralympic Committee of Bangladesh
Bhutan	Bhutan Paralympic Committee
Brunei	Paralympic Council of Brunei Darussalam
Cambodia	National Paralympic Committee of Cambodia
China	National Paralympic Committee of China
Chinese Taipei	Chinese Taipei Paralympic Committee
Hong Kong	China Hong Kong Paralympic Committee
India	Paralympic Committee of India
Indonesia	National Paralympic Committee of Indonesia
Iran	I. R. Iran National Paralympic Committee
Iraq	Iraqi National Paralympic Committee
Japan	Japanese Paralympic Committee
Jordan	Jordan Paralympic Committee
Kazakhstan	National Paralympic Committee of Kazakhstan
Kuwait	Kuwait Paralympic Committee
Kyrgyzstan	National Paralympic Federation of the Kyrgyz Republic
Laos	Lao Paralympic Committee
Lebanon	Lebanese Paralympic Committee
Macao	National Paralympic Committee of Macao, China
Malaysia	Paralympic Council of Malaysia
Maldives	Maldives Paralympic Committee
Mongolia	Mongolian Paralympic Committee
Myanmar	Myanmar Paralympic Sports Federation
Nepal	National Paralympic Committee Nepal
North Korea	National Paralympic Committee of Democratic People's Republic of Korea
Oman	Oman Paralympic Committee
Pakistan	National Paralympic Committee of Pakistan
Palestine	Palestinian Paralympic Committee
Philippines	Paralympic Committee of the Philippines
Qatar	Qatar Paralympic Committee
Saudi Arabia	Paralympic Committee of Saudi Arabia
Singapore	Singapore National Paralympic Council
South Korea	Korean Paralympic Committee
Sri Lanka	National Federation of Sports for the Disabled
Syria	Syrian Paralympic Committee
Tajikistan	Tajik Paralympic Committee
Thailand	Paralympic Committee of Thailand
East Timor	Comité Paralimpico Nacional de Timor-Leste
Turkmenistan	National Paralympic Committee of Turkmenistan
United Arab Emirates	UAE Paralympic Committee
Uzbekistan	National Paralympic Committee of Uzbekistan
Vietnam	Vietnam Paralympic Association
Yemen	Yemen Paralympic Association

=== Europe ===
Country	National Paralympic Committee
Andorra	Andorran Adapted Sports Federation
Armenia	Armenian Paralympic Committee
Austria	Austrian Paralympic Committee
Azerbaijan	The National Paralympic Committee of Azerbaijan
Belarus	Paralympic Committee of the Republic of Belarus
Belgium	Belgian Paralympic Committee
Bosnia and Herzegovina	Paralympic Committee of Bosnia & Herzegovina
Bulgaria	Bulgarian Paralympic Association
Croatia	Croatian Paralympic Committee
Cyprus	Cyprus National Paralympic Committee
Czech Republic	Czech Paralympic Committee
Denmark	Paralympic Committee Denmark
Estonia	Estonian Paralympic Committee
Faroe Islands	Itrottasamband Fyri Brekad - Faroese Paralympic Committee
Finland	Finnish Paralympic Committee
France	French Paralympic and Sports Committee
Georgia	Georgian Paralympic Committee
Germany	National Paralympic Committee Germany
Great Britain	British Paralympic Association
Greece	Hellenic Paralympic Committee
Hungary	Hungarian Paralympic Committee
Iceland	Icelandic Sports Association for the Disabled
Ireland	Paralympics Ireland
Israel	Israel Paralympic Committee
Italy	Italian Paralympic Committee
Kosovo	Paralympic Committee of Kosovo
Latvia	Latvian Paralympic Committee
Liechtenstein	Liechtensteiner Behinderten Verband
Lithuania	Lithuanian Paralympic Committee
Luxembourg	Luxembourg Paralympic Committee
Malta	Malta Paralympic Committee
Moldova	Paralympic Committee of Moldova
Montenegro	Paralympic Committee of Montenegro
Netherlands	National Paralympic Committee of the Netherlands
North Macedonia	Macedonian Paralympic Committee - Federation for Sport and Recreation for Disabled of Macedonia
Norway	Norwegian Olympic and Paralympic Committee and Confederation of Sports
Poland	Polish Paralympic Committee
Portugal	Portugal Paralympic Committee
Romania	Romanian Sport Federation for Disabled People
Russia	Paralympic Committee of Russia
San Marino	San Marino Paralympic Committee
Serbia	Paralympic Committee of Serbia
Slovakia	Slovak Paralympic Committee
Slovenia	Paralympic Committee of Slovenia - Sports Federation for the Disabled of Slovenia
Spain	Spanish Paralympic Committee
Sweden	Swedish Sports Organization for the Disabled and Swedish Paralympic Committee
Switzerland	Swiss Paralympic Committee
Turkey	Turkish Paralympic Committee
Ukraine	National Paralympic Committee of Ukraine

=== Oceania ===
Country	National Paralympic Committee
Australia	Paralympics Australia
Fiji	Fiji Paralympic Association
Kiribati	Kiribati National Paralympic Committee
New Zealand	Paralympics New Zealand
Papua New Guinea	Papua New Guinea Paralympic Committee
Solomon Islands	Solomon Islands National Paralympic Committee
Tonga	Tonga National Paralympic Committee
Vanuatu	Vanuatu Paralympic Committee

== See also ==
- Refugee Paralympic Team
- National Olympic Committee
