= List of flag bearers for Eritrea at the Olympics =

Eritrea at the Olympics
- IOC code: ERI
- NOC: Eritrean National Olympic Committee
- Medals: Gold 0 Silver 0 Bronze 1 Total 1

Summer appearances
- 2000; 2004; 2008; 2012; 2016; 2020; 2024

Winter appearances
- 2018; 2022; 2026; 2030

Other related appearances
- Ethiopia (1956–1992)

This is a list of flag bearers who have represented Eritrea at the Olympics.

Flag bearers carry the national flag of their country at the opening ceremony of the Olympic Games.

#	Event year	Season	Flag bearer	Sport
1	2000	Summer	Nebiat Habtemariam	Athletics
2	2004	Summer	Yonas Kifle	Athletics
3	2008	Summer	Simret Sultan	Athletics
4	2012	Summer	Weynay Ghebresilasie	Athletics
5	2016	Summer	Volunteer	–
6	2018	Winter	Shannon-Ogbnai Abeda	Alpine skiing
7	2020	Summer	Ghirmai Efrem	Swimming
7	2020	Summer	Nazret Weldu	Athletics
8	2022	Winter	Shannon-Ogbnai Abeda	Alpine skiing
9	2024	Summer	Biniam Girmay	Cycling
9	2024	Summer	Christina Rach	Swimming

== See also ==
- Eritrea at the Olympics
