= Eritrea at the 2008 Summer Olympics =

- IOC code: ERI
- NOC: Eritrean National Olympic Committee

in Beijing
- Competitors: 10 in 1 sport
- Flag bearer: Simret Sultan Ghebremichael
- Medals: Gold 0 Silver 0 Bronze 0 Total 0

Summer Olympics appearances (overview)
- 2000; 2004; 2008; 2012; 2016; 2020; 2024

Other related appearances
- Ethiopia (1956–1992)

Eritrea sent a delegation of 10 athletes to compete at the 2008 Summer Olympics in Beijing, China.

== Athletics ==
Men

Athlete	Event	Heat		Semifinal		Final	
Athlete	Event	Result	Rank	Result	Rank	Result	Rank
Ali Abdalla	5000 m	13:49.68	5	Did not advance			
Yared Asmerom	Marathon	—N/a				2:11:11	8
Yonas Kifle	Marathon	—N/a				2:20:23	36
Teklemariam Medhin	10000 m	—N/a				28:54.33	32
Tesfayohannes Mesfen	Marathon	—N/a				DNF	
Kidane Tadesse	5000 m	13:37.72	4 Q	—N/a		13:28.40	10
Kidane Tadesse	10000 m	—N/a				27:36.11	11
Zersenay Tadesse	10000 m	—N/a				27:05.11	5
Hais Welday	1500 m	3:45.06	9	Did not advance			

Women

Athlete	Event	Heat		Final	
Athlete	Event	Result	Rank	Result	Rank
Simret Sultan	5000 m	15:16.25 NR	8	Did not advance	
Nebiat Habtemariam	Marathon	—N/a		2:37:03	47

Key

- Note–Ranks given for track events are within the athlete's heat only
- Q = Qualified for the next round
- q = Qualified for the next round as a fastest loser or, in field events, by position without achieving the qualifying target
- NR = National record
- N/A = Round not applicable for the event
- Bye = Athlete not required to compete in round
