= Eritrea at the 2020 Summer Olympics =

- IOC code: ERI
- NOC: Eritrean National Olympic Committee

in Tokyo, Japan July 23, 2021 – August 8, 2021
- Competitors: 13 in 3 sports
- Flag bearers (opening): Nazret Weldu; Ghirmai Efrem
- Flag bearer (closing): Nazret Weldu
- Medals: Gold 0 Silver 0 Bronze 0 Total 0

Summer Olympics appearances (overview)
- 2000; 2004; 2008; 2012; 2016; 2020; 2024

Other related appearances
- Ethiopia (1956–1992)

Eritrea competed at the 2020 Summer Olympics in Tokyo. Originally scheduled to take place from 24 July to 9 August 2020, the Games were postponed to 23 July to 8 August 2021, because of the COVID-19 pandemic. It was the nation's sixth consecutive appearance at the Summer Olympics.

== Competitors ==
The following is the list of number of competitors in the Games.

Sport	Men	Women	Total
Athletics	5	4	9
Cycling	2	1	3
Swimming	1	0	1
Total	8	5	13

== Athletics ==
Eritrean athletes achieved the entry standards, either by qualifying time or by world ranking, in the following track and field events (up to a maximum of 3 athletes in each event):

Key

- Note–Ranks given for track events are within the athlete's heat only
- Q = Qualified for the next round
- q = Qualified for the next round as a fastest loser or, in field events, by position without achieving the qualifying target
- NR = National record
- N/A = Round not applicable for the event
- Bye = Athlete not required to compete in round

Track & road events
Men

Athlete	Event	Heat		Final	
Athlete	Event	Result	Rank	Result	Rank
Yemane Haileselassie	3000 m steeplechase	8:14.63 SB	5 q	8:15.34	5
Aron Kifle	10000 m	—		28:04.06	12
Yohanes Ghebregergis	Marathon	—		2:15:34	22
Goitom Kifle	Marathon	—		2:13:22	14
Oqbe Kibrom Ruesom	Marathon	—		2:16:57 SB	35

Women

Athlete	Event	Heat		Final	
Athlete	Event	Result	Rank	Result	Rank
Rahel Daniel	5000 m	15:02.59	8	Did not advance	
Dolshi Tesfu	10000 m	—		31:37.98	15
Kokob Solomon	Marathon	—		DNF	
Nazret Weldu	Marathon	—		2:37:01	43

== Cycling ==
=== Road ===
Eritrea entered a squad of three riders (two men and one woman) to compete in their respective Olympic road races, by virtue of their top 50 national finish (for men) and top 100 individual finish (for women) in the UCI World Ranking.

Athlete	Event	Time	Rank
Amanuel Ghebreigzabhier	Men's road race	6:15:38	50
Amanuel Ghebreigzabhier	Men's time trial	1:03:22.80	33
Merhawi Kudus	Men's road race	6:16:53	55
Mossana Debesay	Women's road race	Did not finish	

== Swimming ==
Eritrea received a universality invitation from FINA to send a top-ranked male swimmer in his respective individual events to the Olympics, based on the FINA Points System of June 28, 2021, marking the country's debut in the sport.

Athlete	Event	Heat		Semifinal		Final	
Athlete	Event	Time	Rank	Time	Rank	Time	Rank
Ghirmai Efrem	Men's 50 m freestyle	23.94	46	Did not advance			
