= Sport in Eritrea =

Sports in Eritrea primarily consist of football, cycling, and long-distance running.

Football is a popular recreational sport (as it is across the continent), and at a professional level it is played under the authority of the Eritrean National Football Federation. However, Eritrea is best known on the international stage for cycling and running.

== History ==
Football and cycling were both introduced by Italians during the Italian Eritrea period, from the late-19th to mid-20th centuries. In the 21st century, Eritrea has emerged as a long-distance running competitor alongside Ethiopia and Kenya.

== Running ==
Though it is newer to the sport than fellow East African nations Ethiopia and Kenya, Eritrea has produced many successful long-distance runners since its independence. Most notable is Zersenay Tadese, who won Eritrea's first Olympic medal at the 2004 Summer Olympics. He held the half-marathon world record for over eight years, and remains in the all-time top ten for both the 10,000 metres and the half-marathon. Other notable runners include Ghirmay Ghebreslassie, Yonas Kifle, Nebiat Habtemariam, and Weini Frezghi.

== Cycling ==
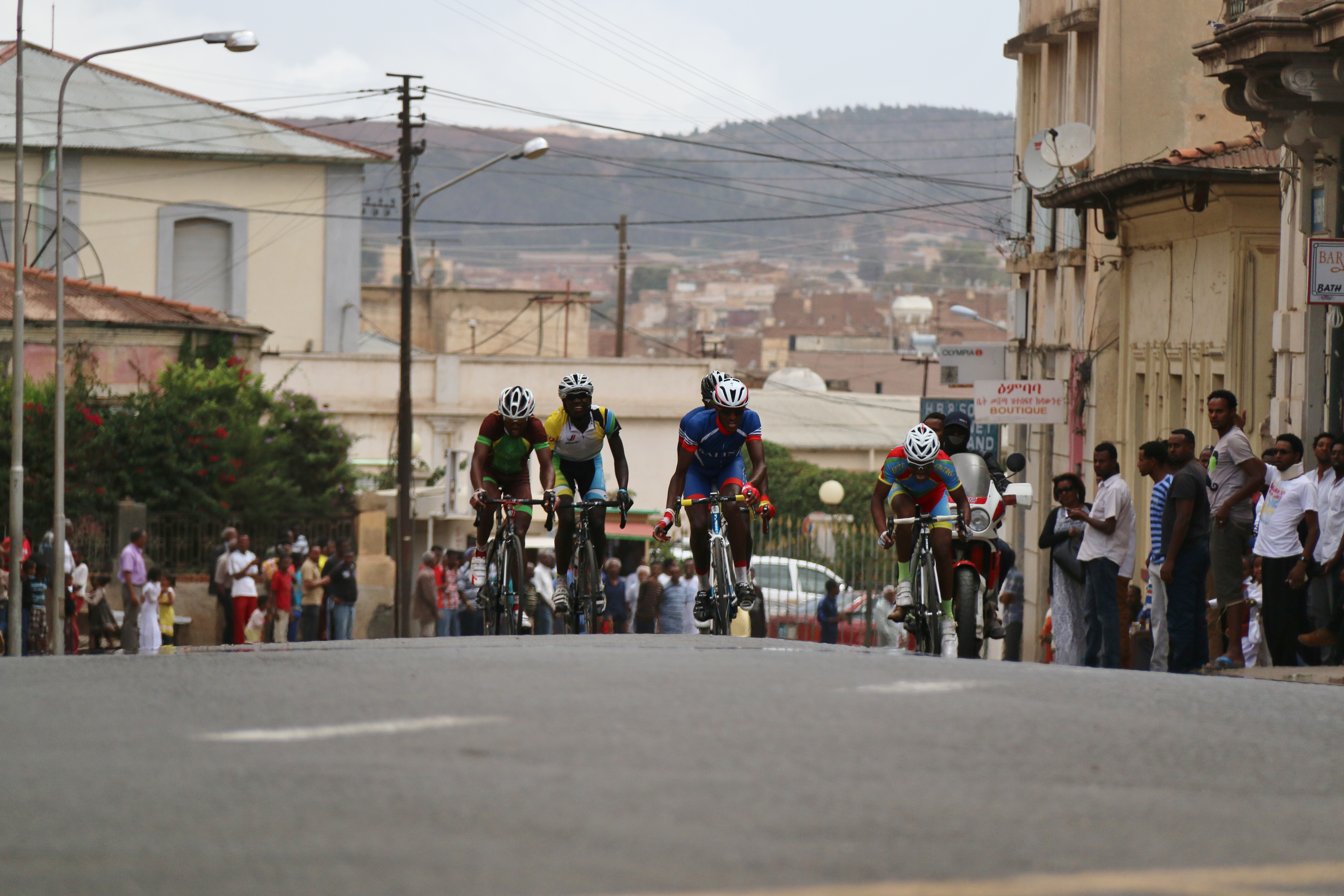
Tour of Eritrea Cycling competition in Asmara Eritrea.

Cycling has a long tradition in Eritrea and was first introduced during the colonial period. The Tour of Eritrea, a multi-stage cycling event, was held annually from 2001 to 2017 throughout the country.

The national cycling teams of both men and women are ranked first on the African continent. The Eritrea national cycling team has experienced significant success, winning the African continental cycling championship several years in a row. In 2013, the women's team won the gold medal in the African Continental Cycling Championships for the first time, and for the second time in 2015 and third time in 2019.

Eritrea has produced a number of professional road racing cyclists. As of 2013, there were five Eritrean cyclists competing professionally: Daniel Teklehaymanot, Natnael Berhane, Ferekalsi Debesay, Meron Russom, and Jani Tewelde. Teklehaymanot and fellow Eritrean Merhawi Kudus became the first Black African riders to compete in the Tour de France when they were selected by the MTN–Qhubeka team for the 2015 edition of the race. In July of that year, Teklehaimanot also became the first rider from an African team to wear the polka dot jersey at the Tour de France. In September 2021 Biniam Girmay became the first black African rider to achieve a podium finish in the history of the UCI Road World Championships, taking silver medal in men's under-23 road race. He has followed this with a successful spring 2022, when he became the first African winner of a classic cycle race in Gent–Wevelgem, and went on to become the first Black African to win a Grand Tour stage at the 2022 Giro d'Italia. At the 2024 Tour de France, he became the first Black African to win a Tour stage.

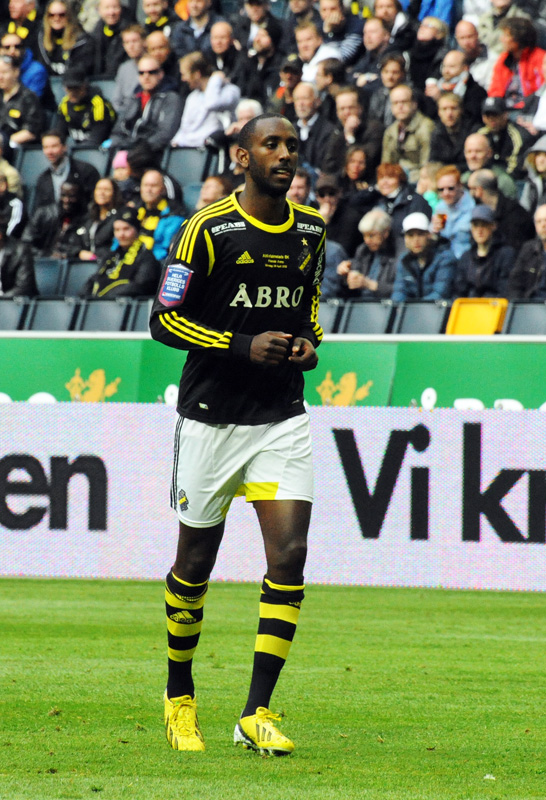
The team captain for the Eritrean national football team is Henok Goitom

Cycling also represents a widespread form of transportation, as many Eritreans cannot afford motorized vehicles.

== Football ==
Under colonial administration, the Italian League was introduced to Eritrea, with the first championship played in 1936. In December of the same year, six indigenous Eritrean teams formed a separate league from the Italian one. Hamasien, the first indigenous club to play in the Italian League, was admitted in the 1944/45 season.

An Eritrean football federation was founded in 1950; however, in 1953, following federation with Ethiopia, the federation's clubs were forced to play in the Ethiopian Premier League. This continued until Eritrea's independence and the formation of the Eritrean Premier League in 1994. The Eritrean National Football Federation was founded in 1996, and became a member of FIFA in 1998.

== Other sports ==
Eritrea has an indigenous martial art called testa (from the Italian for "head") or riesy. It primarily focuses on headbutting.

The game of gena, a traditional form of field hockey played on and around Christmas, is played in the Ethiopian and Eritrean Highlands.

Eritrea made its Winter Olympic debut at the 2018 Winter Olympics in Pyeongchang, South Korea. Eritrea's team was represented by their flagbearer Shannon-Ogbnai Abeda who competed as an alpine skier.

== See also ==
- Eritrea at the Olympics
- Football in Eritrea
