= Eritrea at the 2000 Summer Olympics =

- IOC code: ERI
- NOC: Eritrean National Olympic Committee

in Sydney
- Competitors: 3 in 1 sport
- Flag bearer: Nebiat Habtemariam
- Medals: Gold 0 Silver 0 Bronze 0 Total 0

Summer Olympics appearances (overview)
- 2000; 2004; 2008; 2012; 2016; 2020; 2024

Other related appearances
- Ethiopia (1956–1992)

Eritrea competed in the Olympic Games for the first time at the 2000 Summer Olympics in Sydney, Australia.

== Competitors ==
The following is the list of number of competitors in the Games.

Sport	Men	Women	Total
Athletics	2	1	3
Total	2	1	3

== Athletics ==
Key

- Note–Ranks given for track events are within the athlete's heat only
- Q = Qualified for the next round
- q = Qualified for the next round as a fastest loser or, in field events, by position without achieving the qualifying target
- NR = National record
- N/A = Round not applicable for the event
- Bye = Athlete not required to compete in round

Men

Athlete	Event	Heat		Final	
Athlete	Event	Result	Rank	Result	Rank
Bolota Asmerom	5000 m	14:15.26	16	did not advance	
Yonas Kifle	10000 m	28:08.59	14	did not advance	

Women

Athlete	Event	Heat		Final	
Athlete	Event	Result	Rank	Result	Rank
Nebiat Habtemariam	5000 m	16:30.41	15	did not advance	
