= Eritrea at the 2004 Summer Olympics =

- IOC code: ERI
- NOC: Eritrean National Olympic Committee

in Athens
- Competitors: 4 in 1 sport
- Flag bearer: Yonas Kifle
- Medals Ranked 71st: Gold 0 Silver 0 Bronze 1 Total 1

Summer Olympics appearances (overview)
- 2000; 2004; 2008; 2012; 2016; 2020; 2024

Other related appearances
- Ethiopia (1956–1992)

Eritrea was represented at the 2004 Summer Olympics in Athens, Greece by the Eritrean National Olympic Committee.

In total, four athletes including three men and one woman represented Eritrea in one sport: athletics.

Eritrea won one medal at the games after Zersenay Tadese won bronze in the Men's 10,000 m. It was the first medal won by an athlete from Eritrea in what was their second Olympic appearance.

== Background ==
Eritrea made their Summer Olympics debut at the 2000 Summer Olympics in Sydney, New South Wales, Australia. Three athletes represented the nation but they did not win any medals.

== Competitors ==
In total, four athletes represented Eritrea at the 2004 Summer Olympics in Athens, Greece in one sport.

Sport	Men	Women	Total
Athletics	3	1	4
Total	3	1	4

== Medalists ==
Eritrea won one medal at the games after Zersenay Tadese claimed bronze in the men's 10,000 m.

Medal	Name	Sport	Event	Date
Bronze	Zersenay Tadese	Athletics	Men's 10,000 m	August 20

== Athletics ==
In total, four Eritrean athletes participated in the athletics events – Nebiat Habtemariam in the women's 5,000 m, Yonas Kifle in the men's 10,000 m, Samson Kiflemariam in the men's 5,000 m and Zersenay Tadese in both the men's 10,000 m and the men's 5,000 m.

The heats for the men's 10,000 m took place on 20 August 2004. Tadese won the bronze medal after he finished third in a time of 27 minutes 22.57 seconds. Kifle finished 16th in a time of 28 minutes 29.87 seconds.

The heats for the men's 5,000 m took place on 25 August 2004. Tadese finished seventh in his heat in a time of 13 minutes 22.17 seconds and he advanced to the final as one of the fastest losers. Kiflemariam finished eighth in his heat in a time of 13 minutes 26.97 seconds and he did not advance to the final. The final took place on 28 August 2004. Tadese finished seventh in a time of 13 minutes 24.31 seconds.

Athlete	Event	Heat		Final	
Athlete	Event	Result	Rank	Result	Rank
Yonas Kifle	10,000 m	—N/a		28:29.87	16
Samson Kiflemariam	5,000 m	13:26.97	8	did not advance	
Zersenay Tadese	5,000 m	13:22.17	7 q	13:24.31	7
Zersenay Tadese	10,000 m	—N/a		27:22.57 NR	3rd place, bronze medalist(s)

The heats for the women's 5,000 m took place on 20 August 2004. Habtemariam finished 20th in her heat in a time of 16 minutes 49.01 seconds and she did not advance to the final.

Athlete	Event	Heat		Final	
Athlete	Event	Result	Rank	Result	Rank
Nebiat Habtemariam	5,000 m	16:49.01	20	did not advance	
