= Eritrea at the 2016 Summer Olympics =

- IOC code: ERI
- NOC: Eritrean National Olympic Committee

in Rio de Janeiro
- Competitors: 12 in 2 sports
- Flag bearer: Volunteer
- Medals: Gold 0 Silver 0 Bronze 0 Total 0

Summer Olympics appearances (overview)
- 2000; 2004; 2008; 2012; 2016; 2020; 2024

Other related appearances
- Ethiopia (1956–1992)

Eritrea competed at the 2016 Summer Olympics in Rio de Janeiro, Brazil, from 5 to 21 August 2016. It was the nation's fifth consecutive appearance at the Summer Olympics.

The Eritrean National Olympic Committee selected a total of 12 athletes, eleven men and one woman, to compete in athletics and cycling sports at the Games, matching its team size with London 2012. Competitors Nebiat Habtemariam and Athens 2004 bronze medalist Zersenay Tadese both returned for their fourth Olympic appearance.

Eritrea left Rio de Janeiro without a single Olympic medal for the third consecutive time. Ghebreslassie missed out on the nation's second medal at the Olympic Games, finishing fourth in the men's marathon.

== Background ==
Eritrea participated in five Summer Olympics between its debut in the 2000 Summer Olympics in Sydney, Australia, and the 2016 Summer Olympics in Rio de Janeiro, Brazil. The highest number of Eritreans participating at any single Summer Games was seven at the previous London 2012 and Rio 2016. The flag bearer for the parade of nations was an unnamed volunteer while an alternative athlete named Tsegay Tuemay bore the flag for the closing ceremony. Only one Eritrean athlete has ever won a medal at the Olympics, long-distance runner Zersenay Tadese, who won a bronze medal in the 2004 men's 10,000 metres event.

== Athletics (track and field) ==
Eritrean athletes achieved qualifying standards in the following athletics events (up to a maximum of three athletes in each event):

Key

- Note: Ranks given for track events are within the athlete's heat only
- Q = Qualified for the next round
- q = Qualified for the next round as a fastest loser or, in field events, by position without achieving the qualifying target
- NR = National record
- N/A = Round not applicable for the event
- Bye = Athlete not required to compete in round

Track & road events
Men

Athlete	Event	Heat		Final	
Athlete	Event	Result	Rank	Result	Rank
Abrar Osman Adem	5000 m	13:22.56	8 Q	13:09.56	10
Hiskel Tewelde	5000 m	13:30.23	15	did not advance	
Aron Kifle	5000 m	13:29.45	8	did not advance	
Goitom Kifle	10000 m	—		28:15.99	24
Zersenay Tadese	10000 m	—		27:23.86	8
Nguse Tesfaldet	10000 m	—		27:30.79	9
Yemane Haileselassie	3000 m steeplechase	8:26.72	4 q	8:40.68	12
Tewelde Estifanos	Marathon	—		2:19:12	60
Ghirmay Ghebreslassie	Marathon	—		2:11:04	4
Amanuel Mesel	Marathon	—		2:14:37	21

Women

Athlete	Event	Final	
Athlete	Event	Result	Rank
Nebiat Habtemariam	Marathon	2:45:21	80

== Cycling ==
=== Road ===
Eritrea qualified one rider in the men's Olympic road race by virtue of his top 4 national ranking in the 2015 UCI Africa Tour.

Athlete	Event	Time	Rank
Daniel Teklehaymanot	Men's road race	6:29:25	43
