= Eritrea at the 2012 Summer Olympics =

- IOC code: ERI
- NOC: Eritrean National Olympic Committee

in London
- Competitors: 12 in 2 sports
- Flag bearers: Weynay Ghebresilasie (opening); Zersenay Tadese (closing)
- Medals: Gold 0 Silver 0 Bronze 0 Total 0

Summer Olympics appearances (overview)
- 2000; 2004; 2008; 2012; 2016; 2020; 2024

Other related appearances
- Ethiopia (1956–1992)

Eritrea competed at the 2012 Summer Olympics in London, from 27 July to 12 August 2012. This was the nation's fourth appearance at the Olympics.

Eritrean National Olympic Committee sent a total of 12 athletes to the Games, 11 men and 1 woman, to compete only in athletics and road cycling, the first for the nation. Marathon runner Yonas Kifle had competed at every Olympic games since its national debut in Sydney, and was the oldest member of the contingent, at age 35. Steeplechase runner Weynay Ghebresilasie, the youngest of the team, at age 18, was Eritrea's flag bearer at the opening ceremony. For the second straight time, Eritrea failed to win a single Olympic medal at the London games.

== Athletics ==
Eritrean athletes have so far achieved qualifying standards in the following athletics events (up to a maximum of 3 athletes in each event at the 'A' Standard, and 1 at the 'B' Standard):

Key

- Note – Ranks given for track events are within the athlete's heat only
- Q = Qualified for the next round
- q = Qualified for the next round as a fastest loser or, in field events, by position without achieving the qualifying target
- NR = National record
- N/A = Round not applicable for the event
- Bye = Athlete not required to compete in round

Men

Athlete	Event	Heat		Semifinal		Final	
Athlete	Event	Result	Rank	Result	Rank	Result	Rank
Teklit Teweldebrhan	1500 m	3:42.88	13	Did not advance			
Abrar Osman Adem	5000 m	13:24.40	11	—		Did not advance	
Teklemariam Medhin	5000 m	DNS		—		Did not advance	
Amanuel Mesel	5000 m	13:48.13	15	—		Did not advance	
Teklemariam Medhin	10000 m	—				27:34.76	7
Zersenay Tadese	10000 m	—				27:33.51	6
Nguse Tesfaldet	10000 m	—				27:56.78	15
Weynay Ghebresilasie	3000 m steeplechase	8:37.57	10	—		Did not advance	
Yared Asmerom	Marathon	—				2:15:24	19
Yonas Kifle	Marathon	—				2:21:25	58
Samuel Tsegay	Marathon	—				DNF	

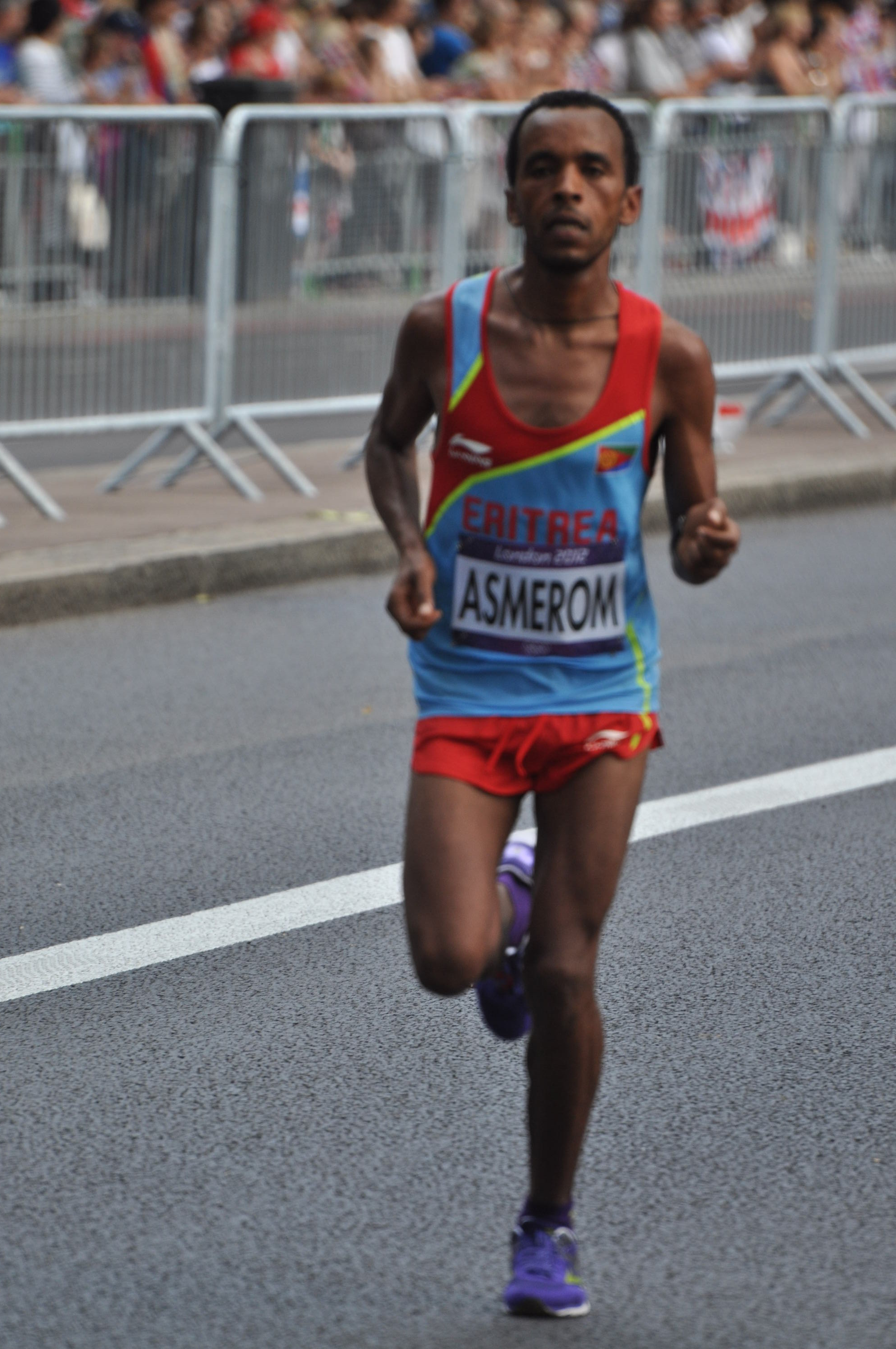
Yared Asmerom

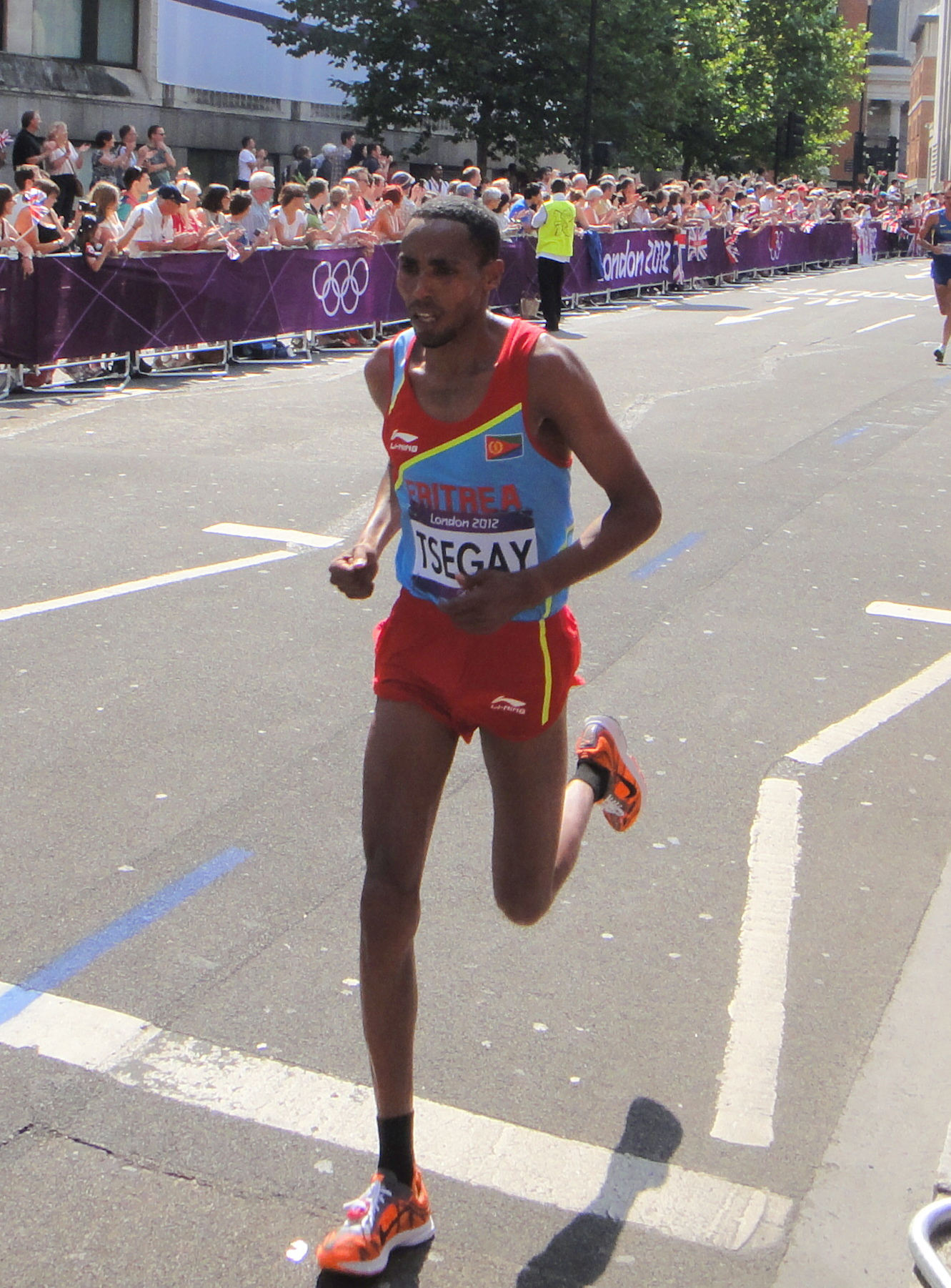
Samuel Tsegay

Women

Athlete	Event	Final	
Athlete	Event	Result	Rank
Rehaset Mehari	Marathon	2:35:49	59

== Cycling ==
Eritrea qualified one cyclist for the Games. It marked the first time Eritrea competed in a sport other than athletics.

=== Road ===
Athlete	Event	Time	Rank
Daniel Teklehaymanot	Men's road race	5:46:37	73

== See also ==
- Eritrea at the 2012 Winter Youth Olympics
