= Eritrea at the 2024 Summer Olympics =

Eritrea at the 2024 Olympics

- IOC code: ERI
- NOC: Eritrean National Olympic Committee

in Paris, France 26 July 2024 – 11 August 2024
- Competitors: 11 (8 men and 3 women) in 3 sports
- Flag bearer (opening): Biniam Girmay & Christina Rach
- Flag bearer (closing): Samson Amare & Dolshi Tesfu
- Medals: Gold 0 Silver 0 Bronze 0 Total 0

Summer Olympics appearances (overview)
- 2000; 2004; 2008; 2012; 2016; 2020; 2024

Other related appearances
- Ethiopia (1956–1992)

Eritrea competed at the 2024 Summer Olympics in Paris from 26 July to 11 August 2024. It was the nation's seventh consecutive appearance at the Summer Olympics.

== Competitors ==
The following is the list of number of competitors in the Games.

Sport	Men	Women	Total
Athletics	6	2	8
Cycling	1	0	1
Swimming	1	1	2
Total	8	3	11

== Athletics ==
Eritrean track and field athletes achieved the entry standards for Paris 2024, either by passing the direct qualifying mark (or time for track and road races) or by world ranking, in the following events (a maximum of 3 athletes each):

Key

- Note–Ranks given for track events are within the athlete's heat only
- Q = Qualified for the next round
- q = Qualified for the next round as a fastest loser or, in field events, by position without achieving the qualifying target
- NR = National record
- N/A = Round not applicable for the event
- Bye = Athlete not required to compete in round

Track and road events

Athlete	Event	Heat		Final	
Athlete	Event	Time	Rank	Time	Rank
Aron Kifle	Men's 5000 m	14:16.77	17	Did not advance	
Dawit Seare	Men's 5000 m	13:52.53	7 Q	13:31.50	19
Merhawi Mebrahtu	Men's 10,000 m	—		27:24.25	15
Samsom Amare	Men's marathon	—		2:08:56 SB	10
Berhane Tesfay	Men's marathon	—		2:18:50	64
Henok Tesfay	Men's marathon	—		2:14:31	54
Rahel Daniel	Women's 10,000 m	—		DNF	
Dolshi Tesfu	Women's marathon	—		2:36:30 SB	58

== Cycling ==
=== Road ===
Eritrea entered one rider to compete in the men's road race through the UCI Nation Ranking.

Athlete	Event	Time	Rank
Biniam Girmay	Men's road race	6:26.57	49
Biniam Girmay	Men's time trial	40:20.65	29

== Swimming ==
Eritrea sent two swimmers to compete at the 2024 Paris Olympics, through the allocation of universality places.

Athlete	Event	Heat		Semifinal		Final	
Athlete	Event	Time	Rank	Time	Rank	Time	Rank
Aaron Owusu	Men's 50 m freestyle	24.25	51	Did not advance			
Christina Rach	Women's 50 m freestyle	27.20	41	Did not advance			

Qualifiers for the latter rounds (Q) of all events were decided on a time only basis, therefore positions shown are overall results versus competitors in all heats.
