= Laban Kiptoo Kosgei =

Kenyan athlete (born 2006)

Personal information
- Born: 9 June 2006 (age 20)

Sport
- Sport: Athletics
- Event: Long distance runner
Medal record
Men's athletics
Representing the Kenya
African Championships
Bronze medal – third place	2026 Accra	5000 m

Laban Kiptoo Kosgei (born 9 June 2006) is a Kenya long distance runner. He won the bronze medal over 5000 metres at the 2026 African Championships in Athletics.

== Biography ==
Competing at the Urban Trail de Lille in France on 4 April 2026, he placed second over 10km in a time of 26:59. He finished in sixth place in the men's 5000 metres race at the 2026 Kip Keino Classic in 13:37.99.

In May 2026, he won the bronze medal in the 5000 metres at the 2026 African Championships in Athletics in Accra, Ghana, placing third behind Dawit Seare of Eritrea and Haji Mubin of Ethiopia, running 13:18.71. He ran 28:36.10 for 10,000 metres at the Kenyan trials for the Commonwealth Games on 19 June 2026. In August 2026, he ran a personal best 12:57.32 for the 5000 meters at the IFAM Oordegem in Belgium. Competing in the Diamond League at the 2026 Athletissima in Lausanne, Switzerland on 21 August 2026, he placed twelfth over 5000 metres.
