= 1999 World Championships in Athletics – Men's 5000 metres =

These are the official results of the Men's 5000 metres event at the 1999 IAAF World Championships in Seville, Spain. There were a total number of 37 participating athletes, with two qualifying heats and the final held on Saturday 28 August 1999 at 21:30h.

== Medalists ==
Gold	Salah Hissou; Morocco (MAR)
Silver	Benjamin Limo; Kenya (KEN)
Bronze	Mohammed Mourhit; Belgium (BEL)

== Abbreviations ==
- All times shown are in minutes:seconds:hundreds

Q	automatic qualification
q	qualification by rank
DNS	did not start
NM	no mark
WR	world record
AR	area record
NR	national record
PB	personal best
SB	season best

== Heats ==
- Held on Wednesday 25 August 1999

RANK	HEAT 1	TIME
1.	Brahim Lahlafi (MAR)	13:34.26
2.	Fita Bayissa (ETH)	13:35.33
3.	Salah Hissou (MAR)	13:36.60
4.	Benjamin Limo (KEN)	13:36.79
5.	Million Wolde (ETH)	13:36.89
6.	Bob Kennedy (USA)	13:37.51
7.	Mustapha Essaïd (FRA)	13:37.87
8.	Alberto García (ESP)	13:39.56
9.	Mizan Mehari (AUS)	13:48.43
10.	Serhiy Lebid (UKR)	13:52.10
11.	Philip Mosima (KEN)	13:52.56
12.	Marius Bakken (NOR)	13:53.07
13.	Keith Cullen (GBR)	13:53.92
14.	David Galván (MEX)	13:54.29
15.	Joseph Nsengiyumya (RWA)	14:10.16
16.	Samuli Vasala (FIN)	14:11.20
17.	Mustapha Hassan Dukal (DJI)	14:33.74
18.	Moussa Yelli (NIG)	14:57.22
	Karl Keska (GBR)	DNS

RANK	HEAT 2	TIME
1.	Mohammed Mourhit (BEL)	13:28.96
2.	Hailu Mekonnen (ETH)	13:29.00
3.	Daniel Komen (KEN)	13:29.39
4.	Brahim Jabbour (MAR)	13:29.42
5.	Adam Goucher (USA)	13:29.49
6.	Pablo Olmedo (MEX)	13:29.95
7.	Isaac Viciosa (ESP)	13:31.27
8.	Manuel Pancorbo (ESP)	13:32.61
9.	Mark Carroll (IRL)	13:34.98
10.	Halez Taguelmint (FRA)	13:40.57
11.	Robert Denmark (GBR)	13:41.28
12.	Lee Troop (AUS)	13:42.96
13.	Yonas Kifle (ERI)	13:46.82
14.	Toshinari Takaoka (JPN)	13:47.44
15.	Salvatore Vicenti (ITA)	14:03.36
16.	Eric Quiros (CRC)	14:04.64
17.	Daniel Browne (USA)	14:18.51
	António Pinto (POR)	DNS

== Final ==
This was the first time anyone ran under 13 minutes at these championships.

RANK	FINAL	TIME
	Salah Hissou (MAR)	12:58.13 (CR)
	Benjamin Limo (KEN)	12:58.72
	Mohammed Mourhit (BEL)	12:58.80
4.	Brahim Lahlafi (MAR)	12:59.09
5.	Daniel Komen (KEN)	13:04.71
6.	Fita Bayissa (ETH)	13:13.86
7.	Hailu Mekonnen (ETH)	13:18.97
8.	Million Wolde (ETH)	13:20.81
9.	Bob Kennedy (USA)	13:23.52
10.	Pablo Olmedo (MEX)	13:27.74
11.	Manuel Pancorbo (ESP)	13:32.12
12.	Adam Goucher (USA)	13:39.24
13.	Isaac Viciosa (ESP)	13:49.59
14.	Mark Carroll (IRL)	13:52.23
	Brahim Jabbour (MAR)	DNF
