= Dagne =

Dagne is a given name and surname. Notable people with it include:

== Given name ==
- Dagne Alemu (born 1980), Ethiopian-long-distance runner
- Dagnė Čiukšytė (born 1977), Lithuanian chess player
- Dagné Y. Alvarez (1995), Panamenian lawyer

== Surname ==
- Birhan Dagne (born 1978), Ethiopian-born British long-distance runner
