= 2026 African Championships in Athletics – Men's 5000 metres =

Men's 5000 metres at the 2026 African Championships in Athletics
- Venue: Legon Sports Stadium
- Location: Accra, Ghana
- Dates: 17 May
- Competitors: 27 from 15 nations
- Winning time: 13:16.92

Medalists
gold medal	Dawit Seare	Eritrea
silver medal	Mubin Haji	Ethiopia
bronze medal	Laban Kiptoo Kosgei	Kenya

The men's 5000 metres event at the 2026 African Championships in Athletics was held on 17 May in Accra, Ghana.

== Results ==
Rank	Athlete	Nationality	Time	Notes
1st place, gold medalist(s)	Dawit Seare	Eritrea	13:16.92	
2nd place, silver medalist(s)	Mubin Haji	Ethiopia	13:18.33	
3rd place, bronze medalist(s)	Laban Kiptoo Kosgei	Kenya	13:18.71	
4	Jenberu Sisay	Ethiopia	13:19.23	
5	Hani Idriss Hersi	Djibouti	13:20.09	
6	Denis Kipkoech	Kenya	13:20.91	
7	Andrew Kiptoo Alamisi	Kenya	13:22.47	
8	Dolphine Chelimo	Uganda	13:26.19	
9	Saymon Amanuel	Eritrea	13:27.39	
10	Abrha Gebru	Ethiopia	13:28.21	
11	Abraham Guem	South Sudan	13:31.76	
12	Samuel Simba Cherop	Uganda	13:34.30	
13	Dan Kibet	Uganda	13:40.52	
14	Alexander Tesfay	Eritrea	13:42.90	
15	Mao Ako Hando	Tanzania	13:49.01	
16	Ayoub Ezziani	Morocco	13:57.60	
17	Hamza Chahid	Morocco	14:01.46	
18	Gyang James	Nigeria	14:10.78	
19	Ousmane Seydou	Niger	14:19.49	
20	Yacoub Tchoumon	Benin	14:19.55	
21	Mancoba Sangweni	Eswatini	14:34.43	
22	Ncamiso Hlatjwako	Eswatini	14:35.68	
23	Djessy Moulele	Gabon	14:59.53	
24	Lopang Oontse	Botswana	14:59.87	
25	Lokoro Dario	ART	15:10.56	
	Ahmed Daher	Djibouti	DNF	
	William Amponsah	Ghana	DNF	
	Antônio Teko	Angola	DNS	
	Elie Sindayikengdera	Burundi	DNS	
	Mathayo Sombi Samhenda	Tanzania	DNS	
	Inyasi Nicodemus Sulley	Tanzania	DNS	
