= Athletics at the 2000 Summer Olympics – Men's 5000 metres =

Men's 5000 metres at the Games of the XXVII Olympiad
- Venue: Stadium Australia
- Date: 27 September 2000 (heats); 30 September 2000 (final)
- Competitors: 38 from 22 nations
- Winning time: 13:35.49

Medalists
1st place, gold medalist(s)		Million Wolde; Ethiopia
2nd place, silver medalist(s)		Ali Saïdi-Sief; Algeria
3rd place, bronze medalist(s)		Brahim Lahlafi; Morocco

The Men's 5000 metres at the 2000 Summer Olympics as part of the athletics programme was held at Stadium Australia on Wednesday 27 September, and Saturday 30 September 2000. The top six runners in each of the initial two heats automatically qualified for the final. The next three fastest runners from across the heats also qualified. There were a total number of 38 participating athletes.

== Medalists ==
Gold	Million Wolde; Ethiopia
Silver	Ali Saïdi-Sief; Algeria
Bronze	Brahim Lahlafi; Morocco

== Records ==
World Record	12:39.36	Haile Gebrselassie	Ethiopia	Helsinki, Finland	13 June 1998
Olympic Record	13:05.59	Saïd Aouita	Morocco	Los Angeles, California, United States	11 August 1984

== Results ==
All times shown are in seconds.

- Q denotes qualification by place in heat.
- q denotes qualification by overall place.
- DNS denotes did not start.
- DNF denotes did not finish.
- DQ denotes disqualification.
- NR denotes national record.
- OR denotes Olympic record.
- WR denotes world record.
- PB denotes personal best.
- SB denotes season best.

== Qualifying heats ==
Heat 1 of 2 Date: Wednesday 27 September 2000
Place		Athlete	Nation	Lane	Time	Qual.	Notes
Heat	Overall	Athlete	Nation	Lane	Time	Qual.	Notes
1	1	Brahim Lahlafi	Morocco	7	13:22.70	Q	
2	2	Million Wolde	Ethiopia	4	13:22.75	Q	
3	3	Fita Bayisa	Ethiopia	16	13:22.92	Q	
4	4	Réda Benzine	Algeria	11	13:23.10	Q	SB
5	5	Julius Gitahi	Kenya	3	13:23.12	Q	SB
6	6	Richard Limo	Kenya	15	13:23:17	Q	
7	7	Adam Goucher	United States	6	13:24.34	q	
8	8	Mizan Mehari	Australia	13	13:24.56	q	SB
9	9	Jirka Arndt	Germany	2	13:26.18	q	
10	23	Katsuhiko Hanada	Japan	12	13:41.31		SB
11	25	Marius Bakken	Norway	9	13:44.80		
12	26	Nicholas Rogers	United States	18	13:46.18		
13	28	Michael Power	Australia	8	13:51.00		
14	29	Ahmed Ibrahim Warsama	Qatar	14	14:00.30		
15	30	Kristen Bowditch	Great Britain	1	14:08.92		
16	31	Alberto García	Spain	18	14:11.65		
17	33	Hélder Ornelas	Portugal	10	14:29.01		
18		David Galván	Mexico	5	DNS		

Heat 2 of 2 Date: Wednesday 27 September 2000
Place		Athlete	Nation	Lane	Time	Qual.	Notes
Heat	Overall	Athlete	Nation	Lane	Time	Qual.	Notes
1	10	Ali Saïdi-Sief	Algeria	1	13:29.34	Q	
2	11	Serhiy Lebid	Ukraine	17	13:29.69	Q	
3	12	Dagne Alemu	Ethiopia	11	13:29.93	Q	
4	13	David Chelule	Kenya	8	13:29.98	Q	
5	14	Toshinari Takaoka	Japan	6	13:29.99	Q	
6	15	Mohamed Suleiman	Qatar	12	13:30:12	Q	
7	16	Mark Carroll	Ireland	9	13:30.60		
8	17	Craig Mottram	Australia	2	13:31.06		
9	18	Yousef El Nasri	Spain	5	13:34.49		
10	19	Mohamed Saïd El Wardi	Morocco	13	13:35.18		
11	20	Bradley Hauser	United States	18	13:39.41		
12	21	Pablo Olmedo	Mexico	14	13:40.34		
13	22	Mustapha Essaïd	France	7	13:40.82		
14	24	Sam Mfula Mwape	Zambia	19	13:41.72		
15	27	Vénuste Niyongabo	Burundi	10	13:49.57		
16	32	Bolota Asmerom	Eritrea	16	14:15.26		
17	34	Gyan Bahadur Bohara	Nepal	20	14:34.15		NR
18	35	Houna Murad Murad Shihab	Iraq	3	14:49.40		
19	36	Maung Maung Nge	Myanmar	15	15:12.93		
20		Mohammed Mourhit	Belgium	4	DNS		

Overall Results Semi-finals

Semi-finals Overall Results
Place	Athlete	Nation	Heat	Lane	Place	Time	Qual.	Notes
1	Brahim Lahlafi	Morocco	1	7	1	13:22.70	Q	
2	Million Wolde	Ethiopia	1	4	2	13:22.75	Q	
3	Fita Bayisa	Ethiopia	1	16	3	13:22.92	Q	
4	Réda Benzine	Algeria	1	11	4	13:23.10	Q	SB
5	Julius Gitahi	Kenya	1	3	5	13:23.12	Q	SB
6	Richard Limo	Kenya	1	15	6	13:23:17	Q	
7	Adam Goucher	United States	1	6	7	13:24.34	q	
8	Mizan Mehari	Australia	1	13	8	13:24.56	q	SB
9	Jirka Arndt	Germany	1	2	9	13:26.18	q	
10	Ali Saïdi-Sief	Algeria	2	1	1	13:29.34	Q	
11	Serhiy Lebid	Ukraine	2	17	2	13:29.69	Q	
12	Dagne Alemu	Ethiopia	2	11	3	13:29.98	Q	
13	David Chelule	Kenya	2	8	4	13:29.98	Q	
14	Toshinari Takaoka	Japan	2	6	5	13:29.99	Q	
15	Mohamed Suleiman	Qatar	2	12	6	13:30.12	Q	
16	Mark Carroll	Ireland	2	9	7	13:30.60		
17	Craig Mottram	Australia	2	2	8	13:31.06		
18	Yousef El Nasri	Spain	2	5	9	13:34.49		
19	Mohamed Saïd El Wardi	Morocco	2	13	10	13:35.18		
20	Bradley Hauser	United States	2	18	11	13:39.41		
21	Pablo Olmedo	Mexico	2	14	12	13:40.34		
22	Mustapha Essaïd	France	2	7	13	13:40.82		
23	Katsuhiko Hanada	Japan	1	12	10	13:41.31		SB
24	Sam Mfula Mwape	Zambia	2	19	14	13:41.72		
25	Marius Bakken	Norway	1	9	11	13:44.80		
26	Nicholas Rogers	United States	1	18	12	13:46.18		
27	Vénuste Niyongabo	Burundi	2	10	15	13:49.57		
28	Michael Power	Australia	1	8	13	13:51.00		
29	Ahmed Ibrahim Warsama	Qatar	1	14	14	14:00.30		
30	Kristen Bowditch	Great Britain	1	1	15	14:08.92		
31	Alberto García	Spain	1	18	16	14:11.65		
32	Bolota Asmerom	Eritrea	2	16	16	14:15.26		
33	Hélder Ornelas	Portugal	1	10	17	14:29.01		
34	Gyan Bahadur Bohara	Nepal	2	20	17	14:34.15		NR
35	Shihab Houna Murad	Iraq	2	3	18	14:49.40		
36	Maung Nge Maung	Myanmar	2	15	19	15:12.93		
	David Galván	Mexico	1	5	18	DNS		
	Mohammed Mourhit	Belgium	2	4	20	DNS		

== Final ==
Date: Saturday 30 September 2000
Place	Athlete	Nation	Lane	Time	Notes
1	Million Wolde	Ethiopia	15	13:35.49	
2	Ali Saïdi-Sief	Algeria	11	13:36.20	
3	Brahim Lahlafi	Morocco	4	13:36.47	
4	Fita Bayisa	Ethiopia	9	13:37.03	
5	David Chelule	Kenya	14	13:37.13	
6	Dagne Alemu	Ethiopia	13	13:37.17	
7	Serhiy Lebid	Ukraine	10	13:37.80	
8	Jirka Arndt	Germany	6	13:38.57	
9	Julius Gitahi	Kenya	12	13:39.11	
10	Richard Limo	Kenya	8	13:39.43	
11	Réda Benzine	Algeria	1	13:40.95	
12	Mizan Mehari	Australia	2	13:42.03	
13	Adam Goucher	United States	5	13:43.20	
14	Mohamed Suleiman	Qatar	7	13:45.10	
15	Toshinari Takaoka	Japan	3	13:46.90	

== See also ==
- 1999 Men's World Championships 5.000 metres
- 2001 Men's World Championships 5.000 metres
