= Mamadou Bah (swimmer) =

Guinean swimmer

Personal information
- Nationality: Guinean
- Born: 9 January 1999 (age 26)

Sport
- Sport: Swimming

Mamadou Bah (born 9 January 1999) is a Guinean swimmer. He competed in the men's 50 metre freestyle at the 2020 Summer Olympics.
