= Eritrea at the 2022 Winter Olympics =

- Flag of Eritrea
- IOC code: ERI
- NOC: Eritrean National Olympic Committee

in Beijing, China 4–20 February 2022
- Competitors: 1 (1 man and 0 women) in 1 sport
- Flag bearer (opening): Shannon-Ogbnai Abeda
- Flag bearer (closing): Shannon-Ogbnai Abeda
- Medals: Gold 0 Silver 0 Bronze 0 Total 0

Winter Olympics appearances (overview)
- 2018; 2022; 2026

Eritrea competed at the 2022 Winter Olympics in Beijing, China. The 2022 Winter Olympics were held from 4 to 20 February 2022.

Eritrea's team consisted of one male alpine skier. Alpine skier Shannon-Ogbnai Abeda as the only athlete from the country, carried the country's flag during the opening and closing ceremonies.

== Competitors ==
The following is the list of number of competitors at the Games per sport/discipline.

Sport	Men	Women	Total
Alpine skiing	1	0	1
Total	1	0	1

== Alpine skiing ==
By meeting the basic qualification standards, Eritrea qualified male alpine skier, Shannon-Ogbnai Abeda. Abeda competed in one event, the men's giant slalom, where he had a combined two run total for a time of 2:40.45, placing him 39th overall out of 87 skiers. This improved his result by 22 spots from 2018.

Athlete	Event	Run 1		Run 2		Total	
Athlete	Event	Time	Rank	Time	Rank	Time	Rank
Shannon-Ogbnai Abeda	Men's giant slalom	1:17.95	46	1:22.50	41	2:40.45	39

== See also ==
- Tropical nations at the Winter Olympics
