= Sam Mfula Mwape =

Zambian long-distance runner

Personal information
- Nationality: Zambian
- Born: 31 July 1983 (age 42)

Sport
- Sport: Long-distance running
- Event: 5000 metres

Sam Mfula Mwape (born 31 July 1983) is a Zambian long-distance runner. He competed in the men's 5000 metres at the 2000 Summer Olympics.
