= Michael Power (athlete) =

Australian long-distance runner

Mike Power
Personal information
- Nationality: Australian
- Born: May 9, 1976 (age 50) Ferntree Gully, Victoria, Australia
- Height: 5 ft 11 in (180 cm)
- Weight: 142 lb (64 kg)

Sport
- Country: United States
- Sport: Track and field
- Event: Mid-Distance
- College team: Arkansas Razorbacks
Medal record
Men's athletics
Representing Australia
2000 Summer Olympics
2000 Sydney	5000 m

Michael Power (born 9 May 1976) is an Australian former long-distance runner who competed in the 2000 Summer Olympics in the 5000m.

Power attended Mentone Grammar high school from 1990 to 1994, then moved to The Peninsula School for his final year of high school. He competed in the 1995 World Junior Athletics Championships in Lisbon, Portugal (1500m) and finished 5th in the final in a new personal best time of 3:43.

== High school ==
After competing in the World Junior Track & Field Championships and having junior personal bests of 3:43 (1500m), 3:58.03 (mile, ranks 147th in All-Time Sub-4 minute miles at the Prefontaine Classic) 8:02 (3000m), he accepted a scholarship at the University Of Arkansas and became 9-time All-American while competing for 4 years.

Michael still holds the current Australian underage track records:
Under 16 1000m 2:28.7
Under 18 1000m 2:23.1

== NCAA ==
Power accepted a scholarship at the University of Arkansas and became 9-time All-American while competing for 4 years. Power graduated in fall 1999 after winning the 1999 SEC Cross Country Championship in 24:10.60.

Power won Southeastern Conference Cross Country Title in 1998 in 23:55.79 and 1999 in 24:10.60. Power won Southeastern Conference indoor track and field title in 1999 in Mile 4:01.80 and 3,000 Meters 7:56.06. Power won Southeastern Conference outdoor track and field title in 1998 5000 meters in 14:02.37. At the 1998 NCAA Outdoor Track and Field Championship, Power finished 3rd in 5000 meters.

Power is in the Arkansas indoor track record book in 3000 meters in 7:50.25, Distance Medley Relay in 9:28.78, outdoor track 5000 meters in 13:36.37.

Power finished second at the 1999 NCAA Cross Country Championships.

== Post College ==
In 2000, Power won the National 5000m open championship and was selected to compete in the 2000 Olympics. He finished 13th in Heat 1 and finished 28th overall. After the Olympics, he lived on the Mornington Peninsula in the state of Victoria while competing for Nike on the international track & field circuit.

He lived in Athens briefly before the 2004 Athens Olympics. Afterward moved to Barcelona Spain and worked in the city. He owned and coached a marathon training group.

Mike Power coached at University of Memphis middle and distance running track and cross country for a few years after moving from Spain.

From 2021, Power worked as a Bentonville High School teacher/coach in Arkansas.

Power and his wife Jennifer, a former Arkansas volleyball player, were featured in a season 4 episode of the HGTV series Fixer to Fabulous, in which the hosts (and personal friends) Dave and Jenny Marrs renovated their northwest Arkansas home.

Event	Result	Venue	Date
800m	1:51.38	Melbourne, AUS	15.02.04
1500m	3:40.23	Melbourne, AUS	12.02.04
Mile	3:58.03	Eugene, USA	04.06.95
Mile (i)	3:59.85	Fairfax, VA, USA	29.01.99
2000m	5:01.85	Villeneuve d'Ascq, FRA	17.06.01
3000m	7:46.22	Brisbane, AUS	08.09.00
3000m (i)	7:55.36	Indianapolis, IN, USA	06.03.99
5000m	13:23.56	Osaka, JPN	12.05.01
5000m (i)	14:17.09	Fayetteville, AR, USA	21.01.05
10000m	28:49.73	Brisbane, AUS	12.04.02
10 km Road	28:55	Melbourne, AUS	19.05.01
20k Road	1:03:14	San Sebastián, ESP	13.11.05
Half Marathon	1:06:23	Gavá, ESP	19.02.06
Marathon	2:48:23	Memphis, Tennessee, USA	BQ
