= List of Eritrean records in athletics =

The following are the national records in athletics in Eritrea maintained by the Eritrean National Athletics Federation.

== Outdoor ==
Key to tables: Awaiting ratification Record not kept by Eritrean National Athletics Federation Not ratified or later rescinded by Eritrean National Athletics Federation

=== Men ===
| Event | Record | Athlete | Date | Meet | Place | Ref. | Video |
|---|---|---|---|---|---|---|---|
| 100 m | 10.58 | Berhane Haile | 4 June 1996 | | Lidingö, Sweden | | |
| 100 m | 10.49 (+0.9 m/s) | Berhane Haile | 10 June 1997 | | Stockholm | | |
| 200 m | 21.43 | Berhane Haile | 1 August 1995 | | Uppsala, Sweden | | |
| 400 m | 47.02 | Haben Teklemichal | 29 May 2025 | Nationales Auffahrts-Meeting | Langenthal, Switzerland | | |
| 600 m | 1:21.21 | Haben Teklemichal | 8 May 2021 | Mémorial P. Luginbühl Athlètes actifs | Lausanne, Switzerland | | |
| 800 m | 1:45.43 | Garza Fithawi Zaid | 18 May 2024 | Next Generation Athletics | Nijmegen, Netherlands | | |
| 1500 m | 3:35.96 | Hais Welday | 10 June 2009 | | Huelva, Spain | | |
| Mile (road) | 3:57.94 | Yobiel Weldrufael | 1 October 2023 | World Road Running Championships | Riga, Latvia | | |
| 3000 m | 7:37.23 | Hais Welday | 6 May 2011 | Qatar Athletic Super Grand Prix | Doha, Qatar | | |
| 5000 m | 12:57.22 | Habtom Samuel | 23 May 2026 | LA Track Festival | Los Angeles, United States | | |
| 5 km (road) | 12:56 | Dawit Seare | 19 September 2026 | World Road Running Championships | Copenhagen, Denmark | 19 years, 115 days | |
| 10,000 m | 26:37.25 | Zersenay Tadese | 25 August 2006 | Memorial Van Damme | Brussels, Belgium | | |
| 10 km (road) | 27:21 | Dawit Seare | 12 January 2025 | 10K Valencia Ibercaja | Valencia, Spain | | |
| 15 km (road) | 41:30+ | Samuel Tsegay | 18 September 2011 | | Amsterdam–Zaandam, Netherlands | | |
| 20 km (road) | 55:21+ | Zersenay Tadese | 21 March 2010 | Lisbon Half Marathon | Lisbon, Portugal | | |
| Half marathon | 58:23 | Zersenay Tadese | 21 March 2010 | Lisbon Half Marathon | Lisbon, Portugal | | |
| 25 km (road) | 1:15:06+ | Okubay Tsegay | 17 February 2019 | Seville Marathon | Seville, Spain | | |
| 30 km (road) | 1:30:11+ | Okubay Tsegay | 17 February 2019 | Seville Marathon | Seville, Spain | | |
| Marathon | 2:04:35 | Hiskel Tewelde | 17 October 2021 | Amsterdam Marathon | Amsterdam, Netherlands | | |
| 110 m hurdles | | | | | | | |
| 400 m hurdles | | | | | | | |
| 3000 m steeplechase | 8:11.22 | Yemane Haileselassie | 8 June 2017 | Golden Gala | Rome, Italy | | |
| High jump | 1.85 m | Tesfay Tecle | 1 June 1999 | | Asmara, Eritrea | | |
| High jump | 1.85 m | Idris Mohammed | 1 June 1999 | | Asmara, Eritrea | | |
| Pole vault | | | | | | | |
| Long jump | 6.73 m | Aron Beyene | 31 May 2003 | | Aarau, Switzerland | | |
| Triple jump | 13.51 m | Awet Eyob | 29 August 2015 | | Riehen, Switzerland | | |
| Shot put | 10.83 m | Tedros Tekie | 1–3 July 2016 | | Asmara, Eritrea | | |
| Discus throw | 31.44 m | Tedros Tekie | 2/4 June 2017 | | Asmara, Eritrea | | |
| Hammer throw | 14.88 m | Hadish Mengstab | 8 May 2011 | | Avignon, France | | |
| Hammer throw | 36.37 m | Yafet Dawit | 13 March 2021 | Salisbury University Spring Meet | Salisbury, United States | | |
| Hammer throw | 41.11 m | Yafet Dawit | 21 March 2021 | Lehigh Season Opener | Bethlehem, United States | | |
| Javelin throw | 43.93 m | Idris Mohammed | 1 June 1999 | | Asmara, Eritrea | | |
| Decathlon | | | | | | | |
| Decathlon | 100m (wind) / Long jump (wind) / Shot put / High jump / 400m / 110m H (wind) / Discus / Pole vault / Javelin / 1500m | | | | | | |
| 20 km walk (road) | | | | | | | |
| 50 km walk (road) | | | | | | | |
| 4 × 100 m relay | 42.4 | Eritrea | 3 May 1984 | | Addis Ababa, Ethiopia | | |
| 4 × 400 m relay | 3:20.7 | Eritrea; G. Hatson; Abdu Adi Abdella; Hais Welday; F. Mizon | 3 December 2006 | ANOCA Zone Five Junior Championships | Nairobi, Kenya | | |

=== Women ===
| Event | Record | Athlete | Date | Meet | Place | Ref. |
|---|---|---|---|---|---|---|
| 100 m | 13.36 (+1.7 m/s) | Winta Berhane | 12 May 2010 | Eastern Africa Youth Championships | Khartoum, Sudan | |
| 200 m | 27.49 (+1.6 m/s) | Winta Berhane | 11 May 2010 | Eastern Africa Youth Championships | Khartoum, Sudan | |
| 200 m | 25.8 h | Shewit Tesfaghebriel | 26 April 2002 | | Nairobi, Kenya | |
| 400 m | 54.99 | Nazret Weldu Ghebrehiwet | 24 May 2007 | | Khartoum, Sudan | |
| 800 m | 2:04.37 | Lemlem Bereket | 28 June 2006 | | Montreal, Canada | |
| 1500 m | 4:05.11 | Meraf Bahta | 13 July 2013 | KBC Night of Athletics | Heusden-Zolder, Belgium | |
| Mile (road) | 4:45.35 Wo | Kanari Estifanos | 19 September 2026 | World Road Running Championships | Copenhagen, Denmark | |
| 2000 m | 6:04.77 | Weldu Mekdes | 19 June 2018 | Meeting Elite | Montreuil, France | |
| 3000 m | 8:53.89 | Weini Kelati Frezghi | 30 June 2019 | Prefontaine Classic | Palo Alto, United States | |
| 5000 m | 14:36.66 | Rahel Daniel | 27 May 2022 | Prefontaine Classic | Eugene, United States | |
| 5 km (road) | 15:15 Mx | Rahel Daniel | 14 December 2024 | Al Sharqiyah International 5KM | Khobar, Saudi Arabia | |
| 5 km (road) | 15:29 Wo | Rahel Daniel | 26 September 2026 | 6° Memorial Bruno Lolli | Zola Predosa, Italy | |
| 10,000 m | 30:12.15 | Rahel Daniel | 16 July 2022 | World Championships | Eugene, United States | |
| 10 km (road) | 31:37 Mx | Rahel Daniel | 19 September 2026 | Brose Night Run Prievidza | Prievidza, Slovakia | |
| 10 km (road) | 32:38 Wo | Dolshi Tesfu | 20 September 2026 | World Road Running Championships | Copenhagen, Denmark | |
| 15 km (road) | 48:42+ | Nazret Weldu | 11 November 2018 | Beirut Marathon | Beirut, Lebanon | |
| 20 km (road) | 1:05:49+ Wo | Nazret Weldu | 18 July 2022 | World Championships | Eugene, United States | |
| Half marathon | 1:09:34 Wo | Dolshi Tesfu | 20 September 2026 | World Road Running Championships | Copenhagen, Denmark | |
| 25 km (road) | 1:21:51+ Wo | Tesfu Teklegergish Dolshi | 16 April 2023 | Rotterdam Marathon | Rotterdam, Netherlands | |
| 30 km (road) | 1:39:10+ Wo | Nazret Weldu | 18 July 2022 | World Championships | Eugene, United States | |
| Marathon | 2:20:29 Wo | Nazret Weldu | 18 July 2022 | World Championships | Eugene, United States | |
| 100 m hurdles | | | | | | |
| 400 m hurdles | 1:08.7 | Lidya Ernesto | 28 April 2011 | | Asmara, Eritrea | |
| 3000 m steeplechase | | | | | | |
| High jump | 1.51 m | Hayat Abdelkadir | 1 June 1999 | | Asmara, Eritrea | |
| Pole vault | | | | | | |
| Long jump | 4.58 m | Zhur Remodam | 28 April 2011 | | Asmara, Eritrea | |
| Triple jump | 9.71 m | Yordanos Miceal | 29 April 2011 | | Asmara, Eritrea | |
| Shot put | 8.51 m | Adiam Fissehaye | 29 April 2011 | | Asmara, Eritrea | |
| Discus throw | 24.72 m | Suzana Kelatt | 3–5 March 2017 | | Asmara, Eritrea | |
| Hammer throw | | | | | | |
| Javelin throw | 26.00 m | Azmera Kahse | 28 April 2011 | | Asmara, Eritrea | |
| Heptathlon | | | | | | |
| Heptathlon | 100m H (wind) / High jump / Shot put / 200m (wind) / Long jump (wind) / Javelin / 800m | | | | | |
| 20 km walk (road) | | | | | | |
| 50 km walk (road) | | | | | | |
| 4 × 100 m relay | 52.8 | Eritrea; Selam T. Tesfamariam; Yodit Mehary; F. Ghebremedhin; T. Kiflom | 3 December 2006 | ANOCA Zone Five Junior Championships | Nairobi, Kenya | |
| 4 × 400 m relay | 4:02.8 | Eritrea; R. Teame; Kokob Mehari; Meraf Bahta; Nazret Weldu | 3 December 2006 | ANOCA Zone Five Junior Championships | Nairobi, Kenya | |

== Indoor ==
=== Men ===
| Event | Record | Athlete | Date | Meet | Place | Ref. |
|---|---|---|---|---|---|---|
| 60 m | | | | | | |
| 200 m | 22.42 | Aron Beyene | 15 February 2004 | | Magglingen, Switzerland | |
| 400 m | 48.41 | Haben Teklemichal | 15 February 2025 | Q-Meeting | Magglingen, Switzerland | |
| 800 m | 1:47.21 | Yared Kidane | 21 February 2025 | Arkansas Qualifier | Fayetteville, United States | |
| 1500 m | 3:39.09 | Yobiel Weldrufael | 13 February 2024 | Belgrade Indoor Meeting | Belgrade, Serbia | |
| Mile | 3:59.59 | Habtom Samuel | 25 January 2025 | Dr. Martin Luther King Jr. Invitational | Albuquerque, United States | |
| Mile | 3:57.09 OT | Habtom Samuel | 15 February 2025 | Husky Classic | Seattle, United States | |
| 3000 m | 7:39.62+ | Habtom Samuel | 1 February 2026 | Millrose Games | New York, United States | |
| Two miles | 8:11.47 | Habtom Samuel | 1 February 2026 | Millrose Games | New York, United States | |
| 5000 m | 13:04.92 | Habtom Samuel | 1 February 2025 | BU John Thomas Terrier Classic | Boston, United States | |
| 60 m hurdles | | | | | | |
| High jump | | | | | | |
| Pole vault | | | | | | |
| Long jump | 6.02 m | Awet Eyob | 24 January 2016 | | Aigle, Switzerland | |
| Triple jump | 12.55 m | Awet Eyob | 9 January 2016 | | Besançon, France | |
| Shot put | | | | | | |
| Heptathlon | | | | | | |
| Heptathlon | 100m H (wind) / High jump / Shot put / 200m (wind) / Long jump (wind) / Javelin / 800m | | | | | |
| 5000 m walk | | | | | | |
| 4 × 400 m relay | | | | | | |

=== Women ===
| Event | Record | Athlete | Date | Meet | Place | Ref. |
|---|---|---|---|---|---|---|
| 60 m | | | | | | |
| 200 m | | | | | | |
| 400 m | | | | | | |
| 800 m | | | | | | |
| 1500 m | 4:29.47 | Meraf Bahta Ogbagaber | 13 February 2010 | Road to Göteborg | Gothenburg, Sweden | |
| Mile | 4:52.53 A | Weini Kelati | 27 January 2018 | New Mexico Team Invitational | Albuquerque, United States | |
| 3000 m | 8:46.53 | Rahel Daniel | 18 March 2022 | World Championships | Belgrade, Serbia | |
| 5000 m | 15:32.95 | Weini Kelati | 8 March 2019 | NCAA Division I Championships | Birmingham, United States | |
| 60 m hurdles | | | | | | |
| High jump | | | | | | |
| Pole vault | | | | | | |
| Long jump | | | | | | |
| Triple jump | | | | | | |
| Shot put | | | | | | |
| Pentathlon | | | | | | |
| Pentathlon | 60m H / High jump / Shot put / Long jump / 800m | | | | | |
| 3000 m walk | | | | | | |
| 4 × 400 m relay | | | | | | |
