= 2014 African Championships in Athletics – Men's 10,000 metres =

The men's 10,000 metres event at the 2014 African Championships in Athletics was held on August 10 on Stade de Marrakech.

== Results ==
Rank	Name	Nationality	Time	Notes
1st place, gold medalist(s)	Nguse Tesfaldet	Eritrea	28:11.07	
2nd place, silver medalist(s)	Mustapha El Aziz	Morocco	28:11.36	
3rd place, bronze medalist(s)	Josphat Bett Kipkoech	Kenya	28:11.61	
4	Adugna Takele	Ethiopia	28:12.27	
5	Imane Merga	Ethiopia	28:17.75	
6	Peter Kirui	Kenya	28:34.48	
7	Olivier Irabaruta	Burundi	28:39.26	
8	Charles Cheruiyot	Kenya	28:47.08	
9	Goitom Kifle	Eritrea	29:01.75	
10	Thomas Ayeko	Uganda	29:25.96	
11	Dieudonne Nsengiyumva	Burundi	29:47.38	
	Birhanu Nebebew	Ethiopia	DNF	
	Joshua Cheptegei	Uganda	DNF	
	Moses Kipsiro	Uganda	DNS	
