= Simret Sultan =

Eritrean long-distance runner

Simret Sultan Ghebermichael (born 20 July 1984) is an Eritrean long-distance runner who specializes in the 5000 metres and cross-country running. She was born in Mirara. She won the Cross de Atapuerca competition in Spain in 2007. She competed in the 2008 Summer Olympics in Beijing, China, and was the flag-bearer for her nation during the opening ceremonies of those games.

It was reported in February 2009 that Simret has defected and claimed asylum in the UK.

== Achievements ==
Year	Tournament	Venue	Result	Extra
2002	African Championships	Radès, Tunisia	8th	5000 m, 16:35.38 PB
2002	African Championships	Radès, Tunisia	7th	10,000 m, 34:00.47 PB
2006	World Cross Country Championships	Fukuoka, Japan	17th	Long race
2007	World Cross Country Championships	Mombasa, Kenya	9th	Senior race
2007	All-Africa Games	Algiers, Algeria	5th	5000 m

=== Personal bests ===
- 1500 metres - 4:25.0 min (2001)
- 3000 metres - 9:42.28 min (2004)
- 5000 metres - 15:18.69 min (2005)
- 10,000 metres - 34:00.47 min (2002)

Olympic Games
Preceded by Yonas Kifle	Flagbearer for Eritrea; Beijing 2008	Succeeded by Weynay Ghebresilasie
