= Eritrea at the 2026 Winter Olympics =

- Flag of Eritrea
- IOC code: ERI
- NOC: Eritrean National Olympic Committee

in Milan and Cortina d'Ampezzo, Italy 6 February 2026 – 22 February 2026
- Competitors: 1 (1 man) in 1 sport
- Flag bearer (opening): Shannon-Ogbnai Abeda
- Flag bearer (closing): Shannon-Ogbnai Abeda
- Medals: Gold 0 Silver 0 Bronze 0 Total 0

Winter Olympics appearances (overview)
- 2018; 2022; 2026

Eritrea competed at the 2026 Winter Olympics in Milan and Cortina d'Ampezzo, Italy, from 6 to 22 February 2026.

Alpine skier Shannon-Ogbnai Abeda was the country's flagbearer during the opening and closing ceremonies.

== Competitors ==
The following is the list of number of competitors participating at the Games per sport/discipline.

Sport	Men	Women	Total
Alpine skiing	1	0	1
Total	1	0	1

== Alpine skiing ==
Eritrea qualified one male alpine skier through the basic quota. Shannon-Ogbnai Abeda competed in Giant Slalom and Slalom.

Athlete	Event	Run 1		Run 2		Total	
Athlete	Event	Time	Rank	Time	Rank	Time	Rank
Shannon-Ogbnai Abeda	Men's giant slalom	1:33.00	73	1:23.30	68	2:56.30	69
Shannon-Ogbnai Abeda	Men's slalom	DNF					
