= Pablo Olmedo (athlete) =

Mexican runner (born 1975)

Personal information
- Born: May 8, 1975 (age 51)
Medal record
Men's Athletics
Representing Mexico
Central American and Caribbean Games
Gold medal – first place	1998 Maracaibo	5.000 m
Gold medal – first place	2002 San Salvador	5.000 m
Gold medal – first place	2002 San Salvador	10.000 m
Silver medal – second place	1998 Maracaibo	1.500 m
CAC Junior Championships (U20)
Gold medal – first place	1994 Port of Spain	1500 m
Gold medal – first place	1994 Port of Spain	5000 m

Pablo Olmedo Castañón (born May 8, 1975 in Mexico City) is a middle and long-distance runner from Mexico.

He twice won the gold medal in the men's 5.000 metres at the Central American and Caribbean Games, and competed for his native country at the 2000 Summer Olympics in Sydney, Australia.

== International competitions ==
Year	Competition	Venue	Position	Event	Notes
Representing Mexico
1994	Central American and Caribbean Junior Championships (U-20)	Port of Spain, Trinidad and Tobago	1st	1500 m	3:50.2
1994	Central American and Caribbean Junior Championships (U-20)	Port of Spain, Trinidad and Tobago	1st	5000 m	14:24.4
1994	World Junior Championships	Lisbon, Portugal	4th	5000 m	13:55.19
1997	World Championships	Athens, Greece	15th	5000 m	14:05.59
1998	Ibero-American Championships	Lisbon, Portugal	2nd	5000 m	13:35.21
1998	Central American and Caribbean Games	Maracaibo, Venezuela	3rd	1500 m	3:48.19
1998	Central American and Caribbean Games	Maracaibo, Venezuela	1st	5000 m	14:01.85
1999	World Championships	Seville, Spain	10th	5000 m	13:27.74
2000	Ibero-American Championships	Rio de Janeiro, Brazil	2nd	5000 m	13:44.44
2000	Olympic Games	Sydney, Australia	12th (h)	5000 m	13:40.34
2001	World Championships	Edmonton, Canada	12th (h)	5000 m	14:02.90
2002	Central American and Caribbean Games	San Salvador, El Salvador	1st	5000 m	14:07.82
2002	Central American and Caribbean Games	San Salvador, El Salvador	1st	10000 m	28:36.67
2003	North American Men's Marathon Relay Championships	Akron, United States	1st	Marathon relay	2:05:30
2003	Pan American Games	Santo Domingo, Dominican Republic	4th	10000 m	29:41.31
2007	World Championships	Osaka, Japan	46th	Marathon	2:33:40
