= Emmanuel Bett =

Kenyan long-distance runner

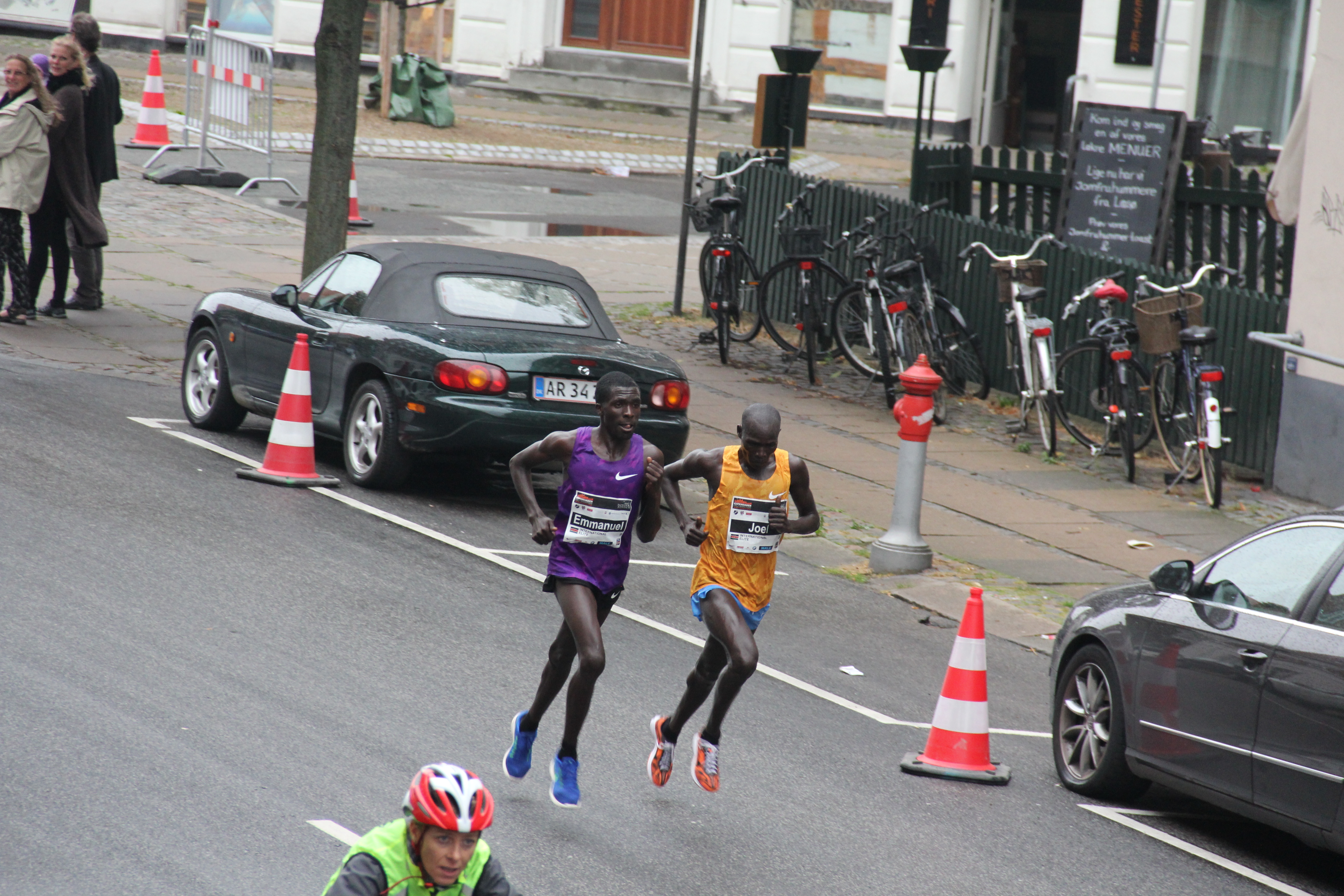
- Bett at the Copenhagen Half Marathon, running with Joel Kemboi

Personal information
- Full name: Emmanuel Kipkemei Bett
- Born: 29 March 1985 (age 40)

Sport
- Sport: Long-distance running
- Event(s): 5000 m, 10000 m, Half marathon

Emmanuel Kipkemei Bett (born 29 March 1985)^{nb} is a Kenyan long-distance runner who competes in track and road running events. He has a 10,000-metres personal best of 26:51.16 minutes, which was the fastest time in the world in the 2012 season.

He was a latecomer to the elite level of running and made his first professional appearances in 2010. Competing in Brazil, he finished second at the Rio de Janeiro half marathon, fifth at the São Paulo 15K, and was runner-up at the Santos 10K. He competed in Europe for the first time in 2011 and made his breakthrough in the 10,000 meters track event. He placed fourth at the high-profile Memorial Van Damme and set a best of 26:51.95 minutes. This ranked him in the top ten that year. He ended the year with a win at the prestigious Zatopek 10 race in Melbourne.

In 2012 he placed fourth in the 10,000 m Kenyan trial race at the Prefontaine Classic, running a time of 27:07.90 minutes. After setting a 5000- meters best of 13:08.35 minutes at the Bislett Games, he also ran the Kenyan trial race over that distance, but in fifth place he was not selected for the Kenyan Olympic team. Despite this, he won at the Memorial Van Damme meeting. and his time of 26:51.16 was a personal best and the fastest 10,000 m by any athlete that year. He also ran a personal best of 60:56 minutes at the Great North Run, taking fifth place at the half marathon, and was the winner at the Cross Internacional de Soria. He retained his Zatopek 10 title that December.

He opened 2013 on the cross-country circuit and was runner-up at the Cross Internacional de Itálica and the Cross Internacional Juan Muguerza. He was in the top ten of the World's Best 10K and the 10,000 m at the Prefontaine Classic, then placed second at the Lilac Bloomsday Run. He attempted to gain selection for the 2013 World Championships in Athletics, but was again out of the running with a fourth-place finish at the 10,000 m Kenyan trials. In October he was second only to Haile Gebrselassie at the Great Scottish Run and topped the podium at the Great South Run 10-mile race, seeing off a challenge from defending champion Stephen Mokoka. His brothers are also runners, David Kiprotich Bett and Josphat Bett Kipkoech.

== Personal bests ==
- 5000 metres – 13:08.35 min (2012)
- 10,000 metres – 26:51.16 min (2012)
- 10K run – 28:20 Bangalore (2011)
- Half marathon – 1:01:40 (2013)
- Half marathon (downhill) – 1:00:56 (2012)

== Notes ==
- ^{[nb]} The IAAF state his birth date as 29 March 1985 but his management company specifies that he was born on 30 March 1983.
