= Eritrea at the 2018 Winter Olympics =

- Flag of Eritrea
- IOC code: ERI
- NOC: Eritrean National Olympic Committee

in Pyeongchang, South Korea 4–20 February 2022
- Competitors: 1 in 1 sport
- Flag bearers: Shannon-Ogbnai Abeda (opening & closing)
- Medals: Gold 0 Silver 0 Bronze 0 Total 0

Winter Olympics appearances (overview)
- 2018; 2022; 2026

Eritrea competed at the 2018 Winter Olympics in Pyeongchang, South Korea, from 9 to 25 February 2018. The country's participation in Pyeongchang marked its debut in the Winter Olympics.

Eritrea was represented by a lone athlete Shannon-Ogbnai Abeda, who served as the country's flag-bearer during the opening and closing ceremony. Eritrea did not win any medals in the Games.

== Background ==
The Eritrean National Olympic Committee was recognized by the International Olympic Committee in 1999. The nation made its first Olympics appearance at the 2000 Summer Olympics. The current edition marked its debut appearance at the Winter Games.

The 2018 Winter Olympics were held in Pyeongchang, South Korea between 9 and 25 February 2018. Eritrea was represented by a lone athlete. Shannon-Ogbnai Abeda served as the country's flag-bearer during the opening, and closing ceremony. He did not win a medal.

== Competitors ==
Eritrea was represented by a lone athlete alpine skier Shannon-Ogbnai Abeda.

Sport	Men	Women	Total
Alpine skiing	1	0	1
Total	1	0	1

== Alpine skiing ==
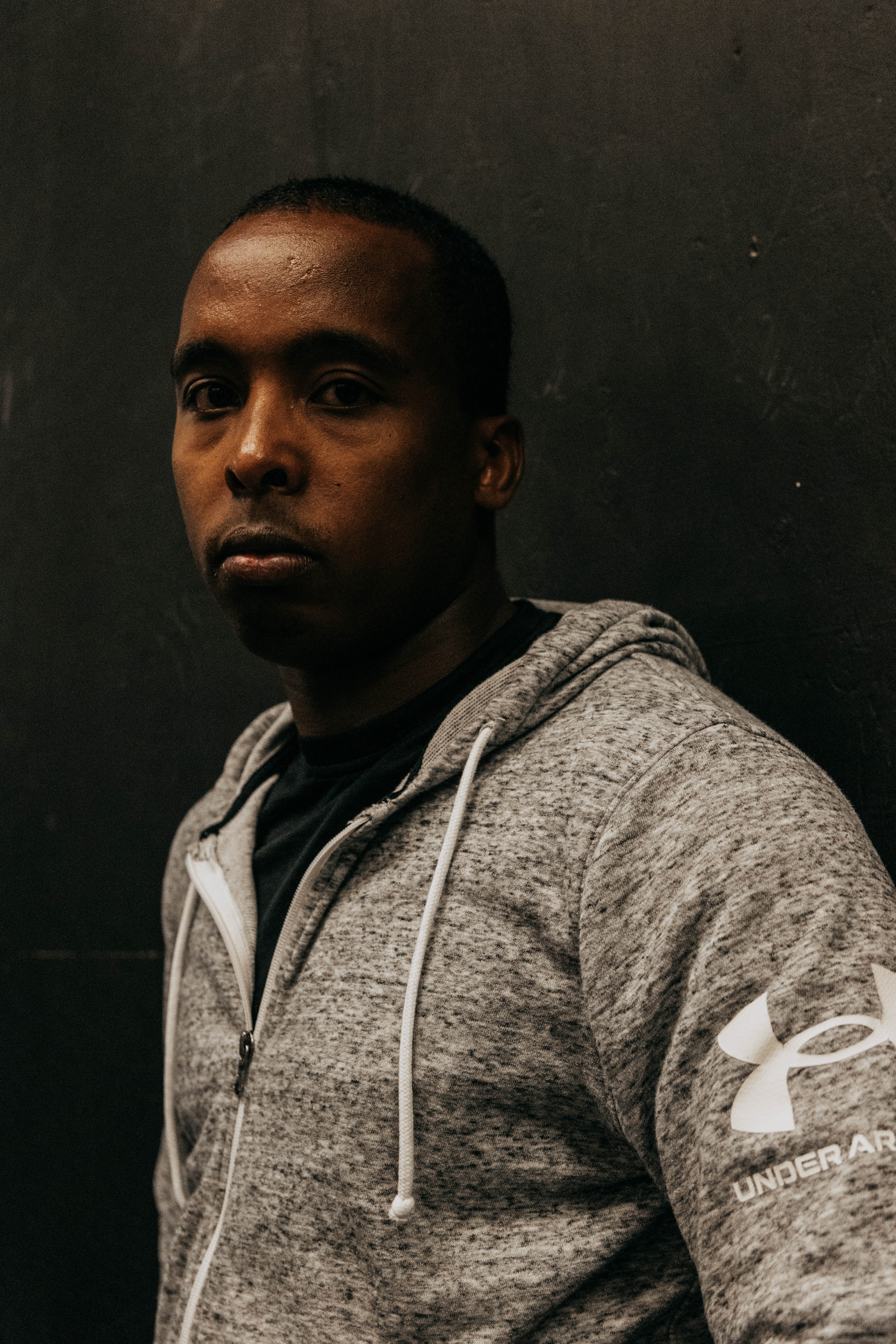
Shannon-Ogbnai Abeda was the first Winter Olympian for Eritrea

Eritrea qualified one male athlete for the alpine skiing event. Shannon-Ogbnai Abeda became the first Winter Olympian in the country's history. Abeda had previously represented the country at the inaugural Winter Youth Olympics in 2012 in Innsbruck, Austria. He was born and raised in Canada.

The Alpine skiing events were held at the Jeongseon Alpine Centre in Bukpyeong. The course for the events was designed by former Olympic champion Bernhard Russi. The weather was cold and windy during the events, and it was the coldest since the 1994 Winter Olympics at Lillehammer. Abeda recorded his best finish in the men's giant slalom event, after he was ranked 61st amongst the 109 competitors. He did not finish the men's slalom event.

Athlete	Event	Run 1		Run 2		Total	
Athlete	Event	Time	Rank	Time	Rank	Time	Rank
Shannon-Ogbnai Abeda	Men's giant slalom	1:19.86	67	1:20.01	62	2:39.87	61
Shannon-Ogbnai Abeda	Men's slalom	DNF					

== See also ==
- Eritrea at the 2012 Winter Youth Olympics
