= Shihab Houna Murad =

Iraqi long-distance runner

Personal information
- Nationality: Iraqi
- Born: 1 January 1968 (age 58)

Sport
- Sport: Long-distance running
- Event: 5000 metres

Shihab Houna Murad (born 1 January 1968) is an Iraqi long-distance runner. He competed in the men's 5000 metres at the 2000 Summer Olympics.
