= Kristen Bowditch =

British long-distance runner

Kris Bowditch
Personal information
- Born: 14 January 1975 (age 51) Stoke-on-Trent, England
- Height: 186 cm (6 ft 1 in)
- Weight: 60 kg (132 lb)

Sport
- Sport: Athletics
- Event: Long-distance running
- Club: British Milers Club

Kristen Robert Bowditch (born 14 January 1975) is a British former long-distance runner. He competed in the men's 5000 metres at the 2000 Summer Olympics.

== Biography ==
He represented England in the 5,000 metres event, at the 1998 Commonwealth Games in Kuala Lumpur, Malaysia.

Bowditch became the British 5000 metres champion after winning the British AAA Championships title at the 1997 AAA Championships.

Bowditch has a 3000m personal best of 7:52.27, and a 5000m personal best of 13:28.22
