= Ali Saïdi-Sief =

Algerian long-distance runner

Personal information
- Born: March 15, 1978 (age 48) Constantine, Algeria

Achievements and titles
- Personal bests: Outdoor; 1500 m: 3:29.51 (Lausanne 2001); Mile: 3:48.23 (Oslo 2001); 2000 m: 4:46.88 (Strasbourg 2001) NR; 3000 m: 7:25.02 (Monaco 2000) NR; 5000 m: 12:50.86 (Rome 2000) NR; Indoor; 1500 m: 3:36.02 (Karlsruhe 2004); 2000 m: 4:59.98 (Budapest 1999) NBP; 3000 m: 7:36.25 (Stuttgart 2000) NR; 5000 m: 13:38.50 (Prague 2009)
Medal record
Men's athletics
Representing Algeria
Olympic Games
Silver medal – second place	2000 Sydney	5000 m
World Championships
Disqualified	2001 Edmonton	5000 m
African Championships
Gold medal – first place	2000 Algiers	5000 m
Bronze medal – third place	1998 Dakar	1500 m
Mediterranean Games
Gold medal – first place	2005 Almería	5000 m

Ali Saidi-Sief (Arabic: علي سعيدي سياف, born March 15, 1978) is an Algerian Olympic runner. His specialty is the 1,500 m race, but he took a silver medal in the 2000 Summer Olympics for the 5,000 m, losing the gold to Ethiopian athlete Million Wolde.

The International Association of Athletics Federations banned him from competing for two years after he tested positive for nandrolone, a banned performance-enhancing steroid, at the 2001 World Championships in Athletics in Edmonton, Alberta, Canada. A second expert examination at a laboratory in Cologne showed that a supplement he had been taking (Peruvat) contained nandrolone, which was not among the labelled ingredients. This did not affect his doping ban, as the rules apply strict athlete liability, but he vowed to seek compensation from the supplement maker.

== See also ==
- List of doping cases in athletics

Sporting positions
Preceded by Hicham El Guerrouj	Men's 3.000m Best Year Performance; 2000	Succeeded by Hailu Mekonnen
