= Josphat Bett Kipkoech =

Kenyan long-distance runner

Personal information
- Nationality: Kenyan
- Born: 12 June 1990 (age 36)

Sport
- Sport: Running
- Event: Long distances

Achievements and titles
- Personal best: 10000m: 26:48.99 (Eugene 2011)
Medal record
Men's athletics
Representing Kenya
African Championships
| Bronze medal – third place | 2014 Marrakesh | 10,000 m |
Commonwealth Games
| Silver medal – second place | 2014 Glasgow | 10,000 m |
World Junior Championships
| Gold medal – first place | 2008 Bydgoszcz | 10,000 m |

Josphat Bett Kipkoech (born 12 June 1990) is a Kenyan long distance runner.

He won a gold medal in the 10000 metres at the 2008 World Junior Championships in Athletics, setting a new championship record of 27:30.85 in the process. He is the middle of three brothers who are all athletes, Emmanuel Bett and David Kiprotich Bett.

== Personal records ==
| Event | Performance | Date | Venue |
|---|---|---|---|
| 10,000 m | 26:48.99 | 3 June 2011 | Eugene |
