= Eritrea at the Olympics =

- IOC code: ERI
- NOC: Eritrean National Olympic Committee
- Medals Ranked 151st: Gold 0 Silver 0 Bronze 1 Total 1

Summer appearances
- 2000; 2004; 2008; 2012; 2016; 2020; 2024

Winter appearances
- 2018; 2022; 2026

Other related appearances
- Ethiopia (1956–1992)

Eritrea made its debut at the 2000 Summer Olympics in Sydney where it sent three athletes to compete in track and field events. At the 2004 Games in Athens, Zersenay Tadese won Eritrea's first ever medal when he finished third in the men's 10,000 meters.

Eritrea made its winter debut at the 2018 Winter Olympics in PyeongChang, South Korea, where Shannon-Ogbnai Abeda competed for Eritrea in the alpine skiing events.

The Eritrean National Olympic Committee was formed in 1996 and recognized by the International Olympic Committee in 1999.

== Medal tables ==
=== Medals by Summer Games ===
Games	Athletes	Gold	Silver	Bronze	Total	Rank
1956–1992	as part of Ethiopia					
(United States) 1996 Atlanta	did not participate					
(Australia) 2000 Sydney	3	0	0	0	0	–
(Greece) 2004 Athens	4	0	0	1	1	71
(China) 2008 Beijing	11	0	0	0	0	–
(United Kingdom) 2012 London	12	0	0	0	0	–
(Brazil) 2016 Rio de Janeiro	12	0	0	0	0	–
(Japan) 2020 Tokyo	13	0	0	0	0	–
(France) 2024 Paris	14	0	0	0	0	–
(United States) 2028 Los Angeles	future event					
(Australia) 2032 Brisbane	future event					
Total		0	0	1	1	151

=== Medals by Winter Games ===
Games	Athletes	Gold	Silver	Bronze	Total	Rank
(South Korea) 2018 Pyeongchang	1	0	0	0	0	–
(China) 2022 Beijing	1	0	0	0	0	–
(Italy) 2026 Milano Cortina	1	0	0	0	0	–
(France) 2030 French Alps	future event					
(United States) 2034 Utah	future event					
Total		0	0	0	0	–

=== Medals by summer sport ===
Sport	Gold	Silver	Bronze	Total
Athletics	0	0	1	1
Totals (1 entries)	0	0	1	1

== List of medalists ==
Medal	Name	Games	Sport	Event
Bronze	Zersenay Tadese	2004 Athens	Athletics	Men's 10,000 metres

== See also ==
- List of flag bearers for Eritrea at the Olympics
