= Bolota Asmerom =

Eritrean long-distance runner

Bolota Asmerom (born 12 October 1978) is a long-distance runner who competed for Eritrea before gaining a US visa in 2002. He attended McAteer High School in San Francisco and graduated in 1995. His personal-record for the 5k in high school cross country was 15:59. He placed 6th in CIF cross-country championships Division 3 in his senior year. After High school, he went on to attend the University of California. Bolota has a brother, Yonathan, who was also on The University of California Track and Field Team.

== Eritrea ==
In 2000, while studying at the University of California he represent Eritrea at the 2000 Summer Olympics in Sydney, he entered the 5000 metres where he finished 16th in his heat so didn't qualify for the final.

== United States ==
In May 2002 he gained US nationality, he entered for the 2004 United States Olympic Trials (track and field), although he finished third he didn't have the Olympic "A" standard time to qualify. In the 2008 United States Olympic Trials (track and field) he was in a good position going into the final turn before being bumped off the track thus losing his rhythm and finishing in fourth place. Asmerom went to McAteer high school in San Francisco, graduated from UC Berkeley, and now lives in Oakland, CA.

Asmerom spent one semester studying counseling psychology at the University of San Francisco. He is currently a coach.
