= Dagne Alemu =

Ethiopian long-distance runner

Dagne Alemu (born 15 October 1980 in Shoa) is an Ethiopian long-distance runner, who specializes in cross-country running.

== International competitions ==
Year	Competition	Venue	Position	Notes
2000	World Cross Country Championships	Vilamoura, Portugal	14th	Long race
2000	World Cross Country Championships	Vilamoura, Portugal	2nd	Team competition
2000	Olympic Games	Sydney, Australia	6th	5,000 metres
2001	World Cross Country Championships	Ostend, Belgium	13th	Long race
2001	World Cross Country Championships	Ostend, Belgium	3rd	Team competition
