= Million Wolde =

Ethiopian runner

Medal record

Men's Athletics

Representing Ethiopia

Olympic Games
Gold medal – first place	2000 Sydney	5000 m

World Championships
Silver medal – second place	2001 Edmonton	5000 m

Million Wolde (Amharic: ሚሊዮን ወልዴ; born March 17, 1979) is an Ethiopian athlete. He is the winner of the 5000 metres race at the 2000 Summer Olympics.

At the age of seventeen, Million Wolde competed in the 1996 World Junior Championships in Sydney, finishing sixth in the 3000 m steeplechase. At the next World Junior Championships, at Annecy, France, in 1998, he won the 5000 m. He also finished eighth in the Junior World Cross-Country Championships at Cape Town in 1996, gained second place at Turin in 1997 and at Marrakesh, in 1998, he won his final junior championships over 8 km. On the road, Wolde represented Ethiopia in the 1998 World Road Relay Championships at Manaus, Brazil. Ethiopia eventually finished second to Kenya, after Wolde had established a narrow lead in the initial 5 km leg.

But the real fame came when Wolde won the bronze medal in the 3000 metres at the World Indoor Championships at Maebashi in 1999 and then finished eighth in the 5,000 m at the World Championships in Seville later that year. At the World Cross-Country Championships, Wolde finished fourth in the senior men's short course (4 km) at Belfast in 1999 and fifteenth at the same distance in Vilamoura, Portugal, in 2000.

The highlight of Wolde's career came in the 5,000 m at the 2000 Sydney Olympic Games, when he was still just twenty two. With no one prepared to set a decent pace, Wolde bided his time and then sprinted past the leaders with 200 m remaining to win in 13:35.49 ahead of second placed Ali Saïdi-Sief of Algeria and Morocco's Brahim Lahlafi. At the next World Championships in Edmonton, Canada, Wolde won a silver medal in 5,000 m.

Injuries hampered his career during recent years, but he was still active as of 2008. As of 2015, he lived in Tarrytown, NY and participated in several local races. As of August 2018, Million was an Assistant Cross Country coach at Saint Thomas Academy in Mendota Heights, MN.
