= Ghirmai Efrem =

Eritrean swimmer

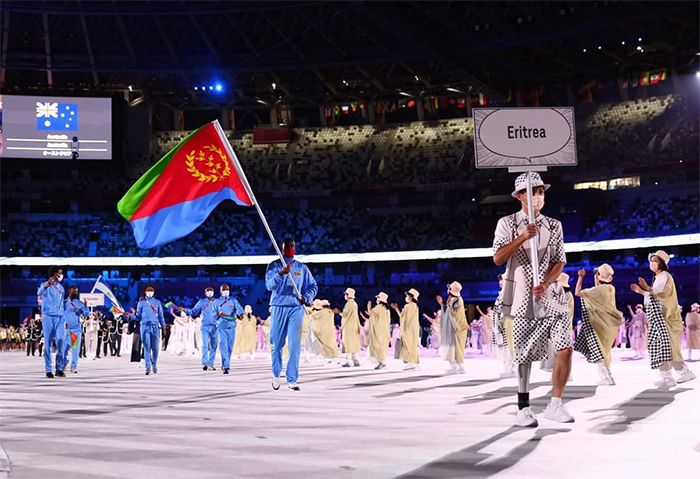
- Efrem (holding the flag) at the 2020 Summer Olympics

Personal information
- Nationality: Eritrean
- Born: 4 April 1996 (age 28); Helsingborg, Sweden
- Height: 1.90 m (6 ft 3 in)
- Weight: 85 kg (187 lb)

Sport
- Sport: Swimming

Ghirmai Efrem (born 4 April 1996) is a Swedish-born Eritrean swimmer. He competed in the men's 50 metre freestyle at the 2020 Summer Olympics.

Olympic Games
Preceded by Shannon-Ogbnai Abeda	Flag bearer for Eritrea; Tokyo 2020 with Nazret Weldu	Succeeded by Shannon-Ogbnai Abeda
