= Mustapha Essaïd =

Athlete

Personal information
- Nationality: French
- Born: 20 January 1970 (age 56) El Ksiba, Morocco

Sport
- Country: France
- Sport: Track, Long-distance running
- Events: 5000 metres, 10,000 metres
Medal record
Men's athletics
Representing France
EAA European Cross Country Championships
Gold medal – first place	2003 Edinburgh	Team
Gold medal – first place	2004 Heringsdorf	Team
Gold medal – first place	2006 San Giorgio su Legnano	Team
Silver medal – second place	2002 Medulin	Individual
Bronze medal – third place	1996 Charleroi	Individual

Mustapha Essaïd (born 20 January 1970 in El Ksiba) is a retired Moroccan-born French runner who specialized in the 5000 metres and cross-country running. In 1998, Essaïd set a national outdoor record of 7.30.78 of 3 000 m event in Monaco. This is the still standing national record. He competed in the men's 5000 metres at the 2000 Summer Olympics.
