= Saymon Amanuel =

Eritrean track and field athlete

Personal information
- Full name: Saymon Amanuel Tesfagiorgis
- Nationality: Eritrean
- Born: 27 May 2007 (age 19)

Sport
- Sport: Athletics
- Event: Long-distance running
Medal record
Men's athletics
Representing Eritrea
World Road Running Championships
Bronze medal – third place	2026 Copenhagen	5K

Saymon Amanuel Tesfagiorgis (born 27 May 2007) is an Eritrean long-distance and cross country runner. He represented his country over 5000 metres at the 2025 World Athletics Championships.

== Biography ==
Saymon ran a new Eritrean national record in the 10K on the road with 27:10 in March 2025 in Lille, France at the age of 17 years-old. the following month, he placed second behind Olympic champion Joshua Cheptegei of Uganda in the elite men’s race at the World 10K Bengaluru 2025 in India.

Saymon ran a personal best of 13:01.85 for the 5000 metres in Nice, France, in May 2025, finishing ahead of Niels Laros and Khairi Bejiga. He placed tenth over 5000 metres at the 2025 BAUHAUS-galan in Stockholm, part of the 2025 Diamond League in June 2025. In September 2025, he competed over 5000 metres at the 2025 World Championships in Tokyo, Japan, without advancing to the final.

In November 2025, he won on the World Athletics Cross Country Tour, winning the Cinque Mulini in Italy, finishing 32 seconds ahead of defending champion Matthew Kipkoech Kipruto, with World Championships bronze medalist in the marathon Iliass Aouani in third. In doing so, he became the second Eritrean winner of the race after Zersenay Tadese, in 2008.

In January 2026, he placed second behind Keneth Kiprop at the Lotto Cross Cup de Hannut in Belgium. He ran a personal best 12:59.37 for the 5000 metres on 28 June at the 2026 Meeting de Paris. On 19 September, he won the bronze medal in the 5k race at the 2026 World Athletics Road Running Championships finishing in a personal best of 13:00 behind Jakob Ingebrigtsen and fellow Eritrean Dawit Seare.
