= Shannon-Ogbnai Abeda =

Eritrean-Canadian alpine skier

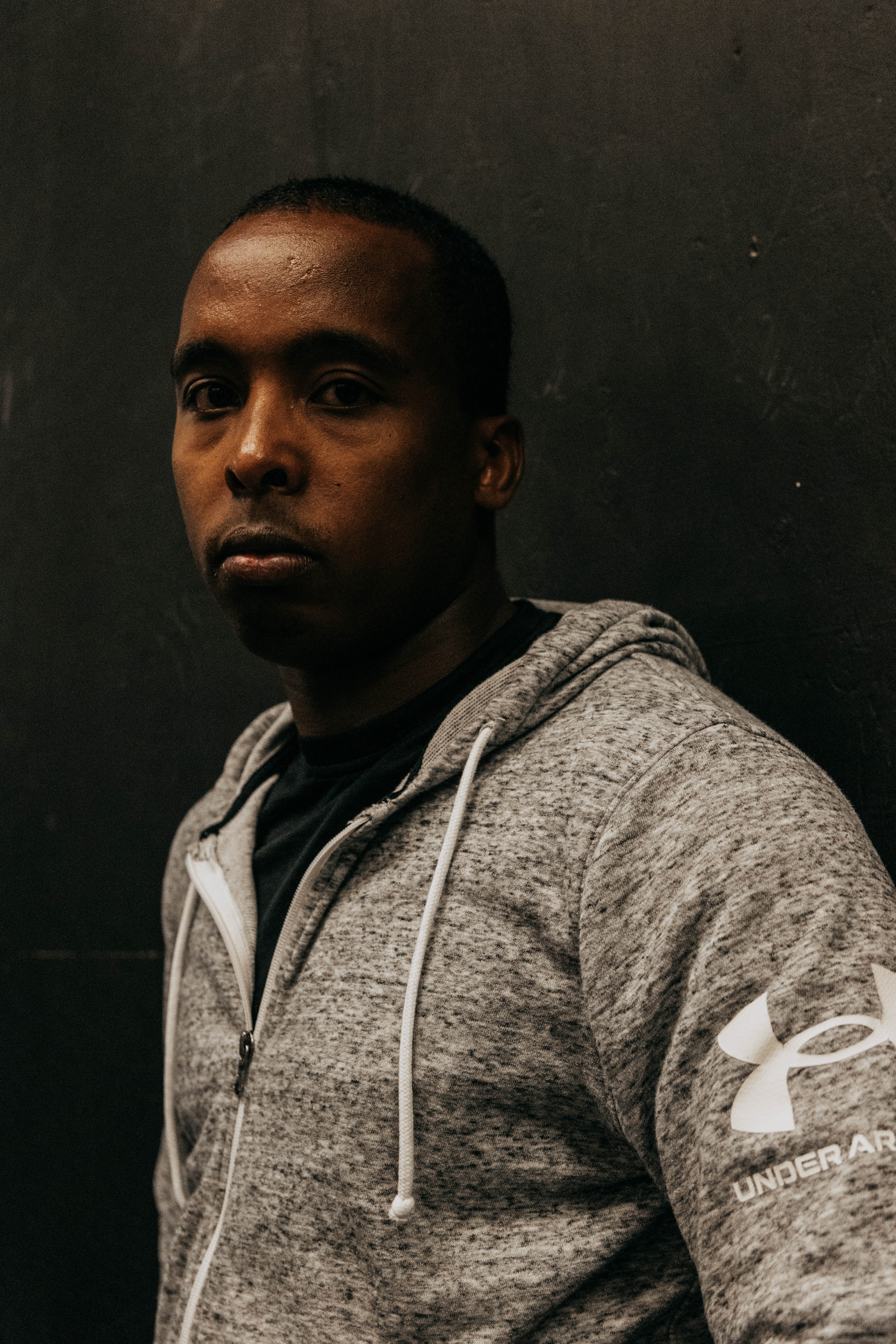
- Abeda in 2021

Personal information
- Native name: Shannon Woldai Ogbnai
- Citizenship: Canada; Eritrea; United States
- Born: 15 May 1996 (age 30) Fort McMurray, Alberta, Canada
- Years active: 2011–2018, 2021-2022, 2023-Present
- Height: 5'10 (1.78m)
- Weight: 90 kg (198 lb)

Sport
- Country: Eritrea
- Sport: Alpine skiing
- Coached by: Helmut Spiegl, Ryley Remme & Cristiano Rogério Paes

Achievements and titles
- Olympic finals: 3 – 2012 Winter Youth, 2018, 2022

Shannon-Ogbnai Abeda (born 15 May 1996) is an Eritrean-Canadian alpine skier athlete. Abeda competed for Eritrea at the 2018 Winter Olympics in the alpine skiing events. Abeda became the first athlete to compete for Eritrea at the Winter Olympics. He finished 61st in the giant slalom event in 2018, did not finish the first run of the slalom event and finished 39th at the 2022 Winter Olympic Games. Abeda's parents fled the Eritrean War of Independence in the 1980s and emigrated to Canada. Abeda also represented the country at the inaugural Winter Youth Olympics in 2012 in Innsbruck, Austria. Abeda originally announced his intentions to take the 2018/2019 season off and attend university after the 2018 Winter Olympic Games however announced his retirement and change to bobsleigh. He hinted that he would return for the 2022 Winter Olympics games, but also at the possibility of retirement. In 2021, his FIS status indicated that he competed in two races in April 2021 confirming his return to Alpine and in September 2021, he officially came out of retirement and announced his intentions to qualify for the 2022 Winter Olympic Games. On December 21, 2021, Abeda qualified for the 2022 Winter Olympics; shortly after his event, he announced his retirement from Alpine skiing. However, as of 2023, his FIS license is active, and he has stated on his social media that he would return for the 2026 Winter Olympics.

On 26 January 2025, Abeda qualified for his third Winter Olympic Games.

== Early life ==
Abeda was born in Fort McMurray, Alberta, to Eritrean immigrants Walday Abeda and Ariam Abeda. His parents settled in Fort McMurray after his father received an entry-level engineering job. His father is a geological engineer who works in the oil and gas industry. He started skiing at the age three after his sister took a day trip to the local ski hill and convinced his parents to enroll her siblings in the team. Abeda and his brother wanted to try hockey, but his parents were reluctant and afraid of injuries that could occur.

Abeda's family moved to Calgary in 2003 and he started to develop a passion for Alpine skiing when he started training in the Rocky Mountains at Banff Sunshine. While Abeda enjoyed the different environment, it was not until he was ten years old that he thought about pursuing an Olympic career, when his coach TJ pushed him outside of his comfort zone. Subsequently, Abeda achieved high rankings in regional races and qualified for national events.

He attended and graduated from William Aberhart High School, where he received his French diploma.

== Career ==
In 2011, he decided to compete for Eritrea in the hopes of competing in the 2012 Youth Olympic Games in Innsbruck, Austria. Having two parents of Eritrean descent, Abeda was granted Eritrean citizenship and a passport. He made his first international appearances in 2012 and competed in many regional races in the US and Canada. In 2014, he attempted to qualify for the 2014 Winter Olympics but missed the cut-off by four FIS points. He subsequently tried again and qualified for 2018 Winter Olympics. Abeda did not compete in an international event until 2018 when he returned to compete in South Korea. After the Olympics, Abeda took a year off to focus on his education and to have surgery to fix his jaw. Leading up to the Olympics in December 2017, Abeda partially fractured his jaw and lost two teeth in a training accident. He also sustained a significant injury while training in February 2016, tearing his anterior cruciate ligament and several other ligaments and partially fracturing his tibia. After two surgeries and a year of rehabilitation, he returned to competition in March 2017 and met the qualification standards for the games. He planned to return to Alpine for the 2019/2020 season, but decided to retire officially.

In July 2019, Abeda posted a video on his LinkedIn account showing him training in WinSport's ice house. He hinted at the possibility of switching to bobsleigh for 2022. Later that month, he confirmed the switch and formally retired from Alpine skiing. However, in 2021, it appeared that Abeda had returned to Alpine skiing after his FIS status indicated that he competed in two races. In September 2021, he confirmed his return to Alpine. On December 21, 2021, Abeda secured a quota for the 2022 Winter Olympics. After the games, Abeda officially announced his retirement from Alpine skiing on his social media; however, it appears that his FIS license is still active.

In November 2024, Abeda started training again for his 3rd Olympic Games and qualified in January 2025.

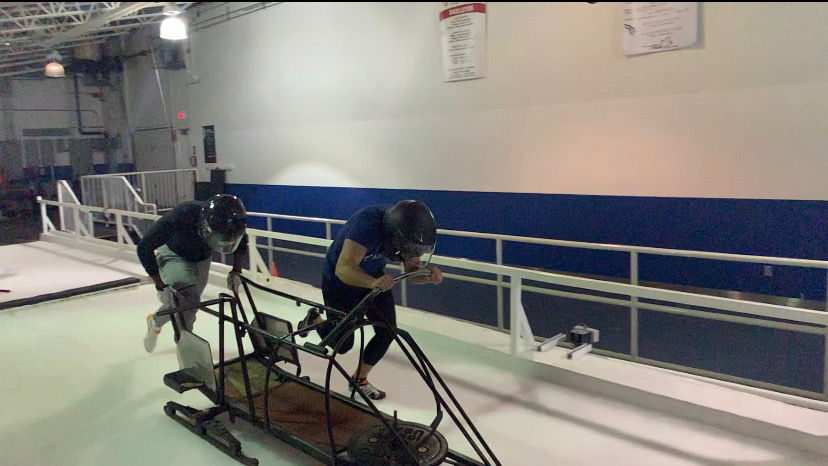
Training clip from LinkedIn

== Personal life ==
Abeda is an avid weightlifter and coder. He dedicates most of his off-snow time to his training that includes an extensive amount of olympic weightlifting, boxing, running, and programming. Abeda is a strong advocate for Bulgarian-style training and heavy lifting. He credits Cory Gregory's SquatEveryDay program as the catalyst behind his training regimen and a vital tool that helped him rehabilitate his knee.

After he failed to qualify for Sochi, Abeda was invited to a TedX conference where he discussed his struggles and his methodology to overcome his obstacles. He explained further why he failed to qualify and the toll it had on his physical, mental, and emotional well-being. Abeda also discussed the negative impact of attending the 2012 Youth Olympic Games and how it damaged his morale and reputation.

His brother, Metawee, accompanied him to the games and walked into the opening stadium during the 2018 Winter Olympics opening ceremony. Abeda's family also joined and stayed in the village with him to provide support. His father, Walday, was the chef de mission for the Eritrean team.

In May 2019, he returned to Eritrea for its Independence Day to announce his candidacy to compete in 2022, with the goal of bringing another athlete along with him. He is working with the Eritrean National Olympic Committee to recruit athletes in the diaspora and build a future Winter Olympic team.

Abeda also holds US citizenship. He currently resides between Calgary and the United States, balancing a professional career and training.

== See also ==
- Eritrea at the 2012 Winter Youth Olympics
- Eritrea at the 2018 Winter Olympics
- Eritrea at the 2022 Winter Olympics
- Eritrea at the 2026 Winter Olympics

Olympic Games
Preceded by Weynay Ghebresilasie	Flag bearer for Eritrea; PyeongChang 2018	Succeeded by Ghirmai Efrem; Nazret Weldu
Preceded by Ghirmai Efrem; Nazret Weldu	Flag bearer for Eritrea; Beijing 2022	Succeeded by Biniam Girmay; Christina Rach
