= Rahel Daniel =

Eritrean long-distance runner

Personal information
- Full name: Rahel Daniel Chebre
- Nationality: Eritrean
- Born: 16 November 2001 (age 24)

Sport
- Country: Eritrea
- Sport: Athletics
- Events: Long-distance running, Cross country

Rahel Daniel Chebre (born 16 November 2001) is an Eritrean long-distance runner. She finished fifth in the 10,000 metres at the 2022 World Athletics Championships.

Daniel is a two-time World Cross Country Tour winner.

== Career ==
17-year-old Rahel Daniel finished tenth in the final of the 1500 metres race at the 2019 African Games. In February 2020, Rahel (Daniel is her fathr's name) finished second in the World Athletics Cross Country Permit series in Albufeira, Portugal behind Lydia Lagat and ahead of Salomé Rocha.

She qualified for the 5000 metres at the delayed 2020 Tokyo Olympics in June 2021, breaking a national record in running 14:55:56 at a qualifying tournament held in Hengelo, Netherlands. At the Games, Rahel was eliminated in the heats with a time of 15:02.59.

In January 2022, Rahel placed second at the Campaccio in Italy, and the following month, won the 45th edition of the Almond Blossom Cross Country in Portugal. As a result she moved into the lead in the 2021–22 World Cross Country Tour standings. As a 20-year-old finished in the top eight at both the World Indoor Championships held in Belgrade, Serbia and the World Championships in Eugene. Indoors, she placed eighth in the 3000 metres race in Serbia. In Eugene in July, she finished fifth in the 10,000 metres race.

She competed in the 10,000 metres at the 2024 Summer Olympics in Paris in August 2024 but did not finish the race.

In October 2026, she placed fifth at the Cross Zornotza in Amorebieta, Spain.

== Achievements ==
=== Circuit wins and titles ===
- World Cross Country Tour winner: 2021–22, 2022–23
  - 2021–22 (2): Cross de Atapuerca, Almond Blossom Cross Country
  - 2022–23 (3): Campaccio, Juan Muguerza Cross-Country, Cross Cup de Hannut

=== Personal bests ===
- 3000 metres indoor – 8:46.53 (Belgrade 2022) NR

- 5000 metres – 14:36.66 (Eugene 2022) NR
- 10,000 metres – 30:12.15 (Eugene 2022) NR

Road

- 10 kilometres – 32:23 (Cali 2022)
