= Goitom Kifle =

Eritrean long-distance runner

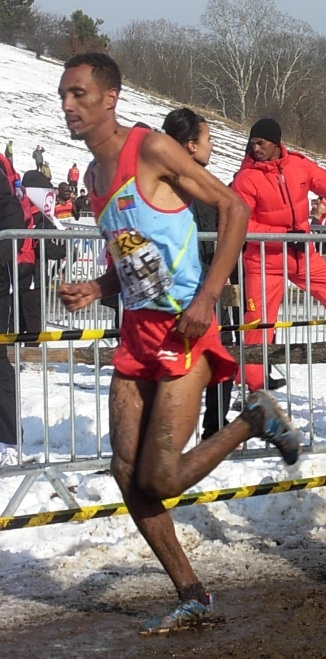
- Goitom Kifle at the 2013 IAAF World Cross Country Championships

Personal information
- Born: 3 December 1993 (age 32)

Sport
- Sport: Track and field
- Events: 5000 m, 10,000 metres, Half marathon, Marathon

Goitom Kifle (born 3 December 1993) is an Eritrean athlete competing in long-distance events. He represented his country at the 2011 and 2013 World Championships.

He competed at the 2020 Summer Olympics in the men's marathon.

== Competition record ==
Year	Competition	Venue	Position	Event	Notes
Representing Eritrea
2009	World Youth Championships	Brixen, Italy	3rd	3000 m	8:05.83
2011	World Championships	Daegu, South Korea	31st (h)	5000 m	14:06.42
2013	World Championships	Moscow, Russia	17th	10,000 m	27:56.38
2014	African Championships	Marrakesh, Morocco	9th	10,000 m	29:01.75
2016	Olympic Games	Rio de Janeiro, Brazil	24th	10,000 m	28:15.99
2021	Olympic Games	Sapporo, Japan	14th	Marathon	2:13:22
2022	World Championships	Eugene, United States	22nd	Marathon	2:11:10
2023	World Championships	Budapest, Hungary	48th	Marathon	2:21:28

== Personal bests ==
Outdoor

- 3000 metres – 7:59.64 (Los Corrales de Buelna 2010)
- 5000 metres – 13:22.92 (Rabat 2012)
- 10,000 metres – 27:32.00 (Eugene 2013)
- 15 kilometres – 42:26 (Lisbon 2013)
- 20 kilometres – 57:36 (Marugame 2016)
- Half marathon – 1:00:20 (Azpeitia 2014)
- Marathon - 2:05:28 (Valencia 2021)
