= Nguse Tesfaldet Amlosom =

Eritrean long-distance runner

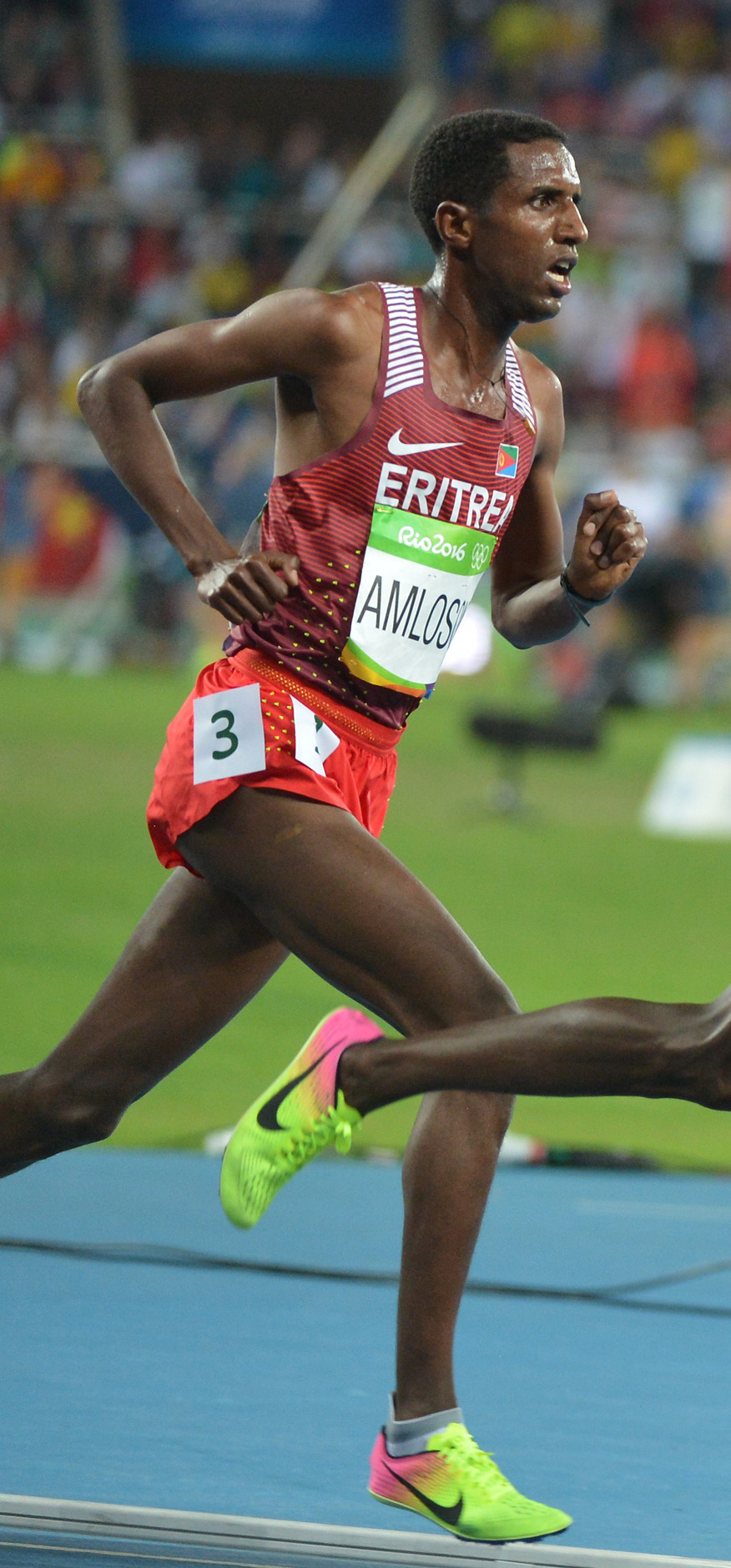
- Tesfaldet at the 2016 Olympics

Personal information
- Born: 10 November 1986 (age 39) Asmara, Ethiopia
- Height: 180 cm (5 ft 11 in)
- Weight: 56 kg (123 lb)

Sport
- Sport: Athletics
- Event: 5000 m – half marathon

Achievements and titles
- Personal bests: 5000 m – 13:30.22 (2015); 10,000 m – 27:28.10 (2012)
Medal record
Men's athletics
Representing Eritrea
African Championships
Gold medal – first place	2014 Marrakesh	10,000 m
IAAF Continental Cup
Bronze medal – third place	2014 Marrakesh	5,000 m

Nguse Tesfaldet Amlosom (born 10 November 1986) is an Eritrean long-distance runner. He competed in the 10,000 m event at the 2012 and 2016 Summer Olympics and placed 15th and 9th, respectively.

== Career ==
Nguse's international debut came at the 2011 Military World Games, where he placed fourth in the 10,000 m with a personal best of 29:05.26 minutes. The following year he came 19th at the 2012 African Cross Country Championships. He showed much improved form in the racing circuit: he ran a 10,000 m best of 27:28.10 minutes, a 10K run best of 28:19 minutes, and won the Zwolle Half Marathon with a time of 61:39 minutes. After his Olympic performance he came third at the Zevenheuvelenloop and runner-up at the Cross de l'Acier.

In his first appearance at a major world race, he came 61st at the 2013 IAAF World Cross Country Championships. He achieved a half marathon best of 60:46 minutes at the Yangzhou Jianzhen International Half Marathon in April. He finished in 8th place at the 2013 World Championships in Athletics in 10000m in Moscow

In 2014, Nguse won the 10000m race at the 2014 African Championships in Athletics held in Marrakesh, becoming the first ever Eritrean to win a medal at the continental meet. At the 2014 IAAF Continental Cup, also held in Marrakesh, Nguse was part of the Africa team running in the 5000m race alongside Kenyan Isaiah Kiplangat. He won the bronze medal with a time of 13:31.31.

At the 2015 World Championships in Athletics held in Beijing, Nguse finished in 15th place.

Nguse was selected to represent Eritrea at the 2016 Summer Olympics, participating in the 10000m race. He finished in ninth place, in a race won by British runner Mo Farah.
