= Nazret Weldu =

Eritrean long-distance runner

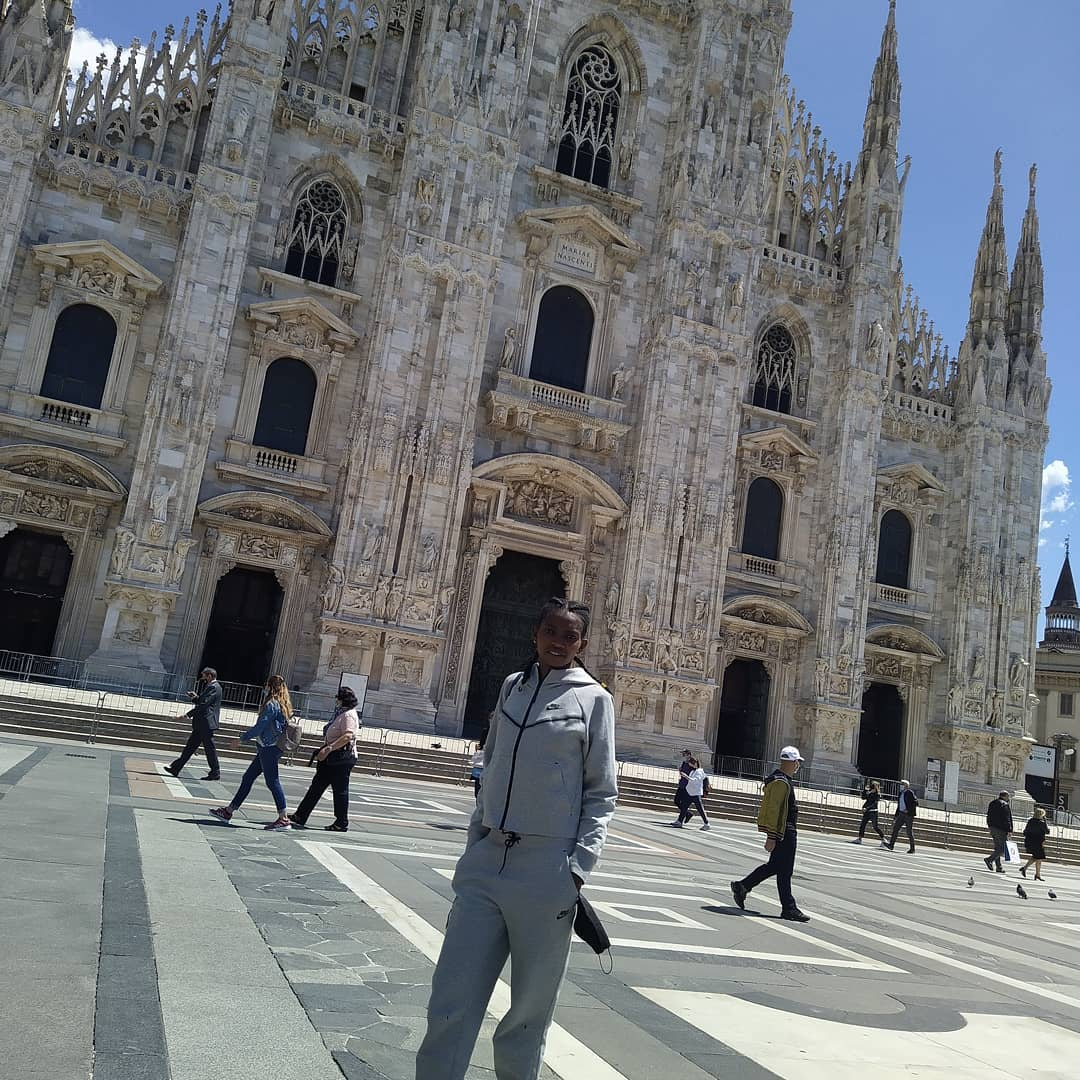

Personal information
- Full name: Nazret Weldu Gebrehiwet
- Born: 1 January 1990 (age 36)

Sport
- Country: Eritrea
- Sport: Track and field
- Updated on 29 August 2015

Nazret Weldu Gebrehiwet (born 1 January 1990) is a female long-distance runner from Eritrea. She competed in the 10,000 metres at the 2015 World Championships in Beijing finishing 24th. In 2019, she competed in the senior women's race at the 2019 IAAF World Cross Country Championships held in Aarhus, Denmark. She finished in 27th place.

She competed in the women's marathon at the 2020 Summer Olympics.

In September 2024, Weldu was issued with a twenty month competition ban to be ineffect from June 2024 to February 2026 due to an anti-doping rule violation relating to three missed tests (or whereabouts failures).

== International competitions ==
Year	Competition	Venue	Position	Event	Notes
Representing Eritrea
2010	African Championships	Nairobi, Kenya	10th (h)	800 m	2:09.24
2015	World Championships	Beijing, China	24th	10,000 m	35:14.18
2019	World Championships	Doha, Qatar	23rd	Marathon	2:53:45
2021	Olympic Games	Sapporo, Japan	43rd	Marathon	2:37:01
2022	World Championships	Eugene, United States	4th	Marathon	2:20:29
2023	World Championships	Budapest, Hungary	8th	Marathon	2:27:23

== Personal bests ==
Outdoor

- 400 metres – 54.99 (Khartoum 2007, NR)
- 800 metres – 2:04.26 (Bilbao 2008)
- 1500 metres – 4:09.34 (Mataró 2012)
- 3000 metres – 9:11.32 (Doha 2012)
- 5000 metres – 15:33.28 (Carquefou 2017)
- 10,000 metres – 32:58.28 (Hengelo 2016)
- Half marathon – 1:09:47 (New Delhi 2020)
- Marathon – 2:20:29 (Eugene 2022, NR)

Olympic Games
Preceded by Shannon-Ogbnai Abeda	Flag bearer for Eritrea; Tokyo 2020 with Ghirmai Efrem	Succeeded by Shannon-Ogbnai Abeda
