= Dawit Seare =

Eritrean athlete (born 2004)

Personal information
- Born: 29 December 2004 (age 21)

Sport
- Sport: Athletics
- Event: Long distance runner

Achievements and titles
- Personal bests: 5000m: 13:07.77 (2024); 10000m 28:57.83 (2026)
Medal record
Men's athletics
Representing Eritrea
African Championships
Gold medal – first place	2026 Accra	5000 m
World Road Running Championships
Gold medal – first place	2026 Copenhagen	5K

Dawit Seare Berhanyukun (born 29 December 2004) is an Eritrean long distance runner. He competed at the 2024 Summer Olympics and won the gold medal over 5000 metres at the 2026 African Championships in Athletics and won the 5k race at the 2026 World Athletics Road Running Championships.

== Biography ==
Dawit placed fourth at the 5 km road race at the 2023 World Athletics Road Running Championships held on 1 October 2023 in Riga, Latvia. With this effort he set a national record time of 13:21:03. Later that month, he won his first road race over 10 km, in Berlin.

Dawit finished sixth over 10,000 metres at the delayed 2023 African Games, held in Accra in March 2024. At the same Games, he also finished ninth in the 5000 metres. Dawit competed in the 2024 Summer Olympics over 5000 metres and qualified for the final, placing nineteenth in 13:31.50.

In March 2025, Dawit finished in tenth place at the 2025 World Athletics Indoor Championships in Nanjing, in the 3000 metres. In April 2025, Dawit won the Boston 5K in Massachusetts, finishing in a time of 13:33, ahead of Amon Kemboi and Patrick Dever.

In May 2026, Dawit won the gold medal in the 5000 metres at the 2026 African Championships in Athletics in Accra, Ghana, delivering only the second gold medal in Eritrea's history at the Championships, 14 years after Nguse Amlosom secured the nation's first in 2014. On 19 September, he won the 5k race at the 2026 World Athletics Road Running Championships ahead of Jakob Ingebrigtsen and fellow Eritrean Saymon Amanuel.

== Statistics ==
Grand Slam Track results
Slam	Race group	Event	Pl.	Time	Prize money
2025 Miami Slam	Long distance	3000 m	5th	8:18.73	US$12,500
2025 Miami Slam	Long distance	5000 m	8th	14:01.96	US$12,500
