= Hais Welday =

Eritrean middle-distance runner

Hais Welday Ghebrat (born 24 October 1989) is an Eritrean middle distance runner who specializes in the 1500 metres.

He competed at the 2008 Olympic Games and the 2009 World Championships without reaching the final.

His personal best time is 3:35.96 minutes, achieved in June 2009 in Huelva.
