= Weynay Ghebresilasie =

Eritrean steeplechase runner

Personal information
- Nationality: Eritrean
- Born: 24 March 1994 in Geza Hamle, Debub, Eritrea
- Height: 182 cm (6 ft 0 in)
- Weight: 62 kg (137 lb)

Sport
- Sport: Athletics
- Event: long-distance
- Club: Sunderland Harriers & Athletic Club

Weynay Ghebresilasie (born 24 March 1994 in Gheza Hamle) is an Eritrean born runner, competing for Great Britain as of February 2021, who specialises in the 3000 metres steeplechase. He competed at and was the flagbearer for Eritrea at the 2012 Summer Olympics.

== Biography ==
Ghebresilasie competed in that event at the 2012 London Olympics, coming tenth in his heat, and was the flag bearer of the Eritrean team. He also placed sixth at the 2012 World Junior Championships in Athletics that year.

Despite receiving the honour of being the flagbearer for Eritrea, subsequent to the Olympics, he sought political asylum in the United Kingdom, citing a repressive regime. He joined Sunderland Harriers & Athletic Club and on 31 January 2021 became eligible to represent Great Britain in international competition.

He finished as the third highest British athlete at the 2025 London Marathon behind Mahamed Mahamed and Alex Yee, with Mahamed claiming the British title as a result.
