= Yonas Kifle =

Eritrean long-distance runner

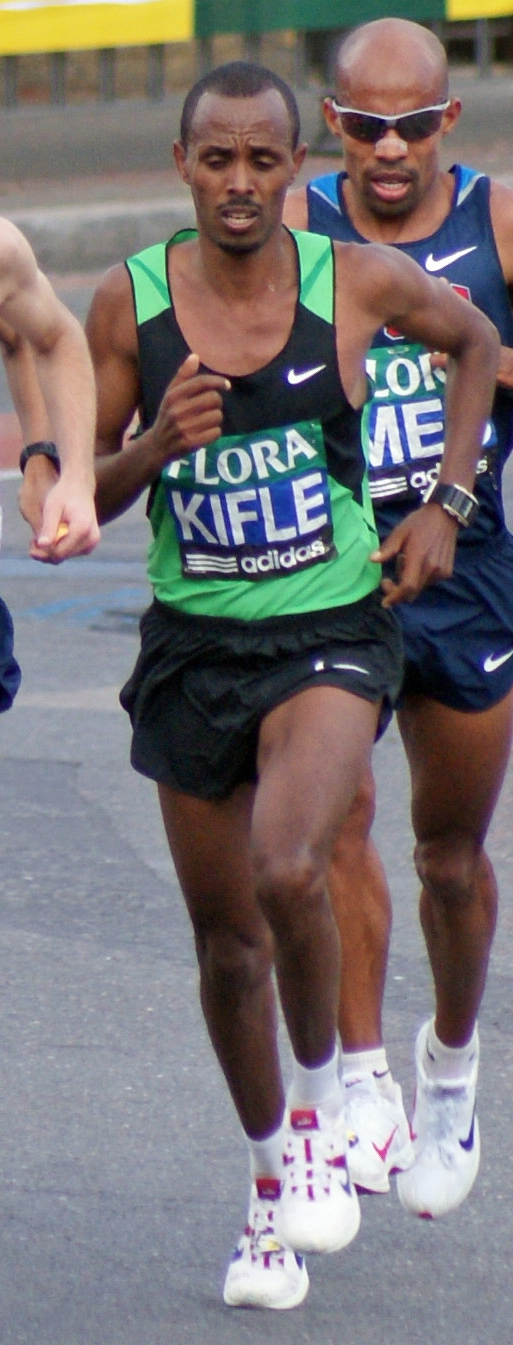
- Kifle at the 2009 London Marathon

Personal information
- Nationality: Eritrean
- Born: November 5, 1977 (age 48) Adi Bilay, Ethiopia
- Height: 1.66 m (5 ft 5 1/2 in)
- Weight: 62 kg (137 lb)

Sport
- Country: Eritrea
- Sport: Athletics
- Event: Marathon
- Updated on 22 July 2012

Yonas Andebrhan Kifle (born 5 November 1977) is an Eritrean runner who specializes in the 10,000 metres, the marathon and cross-country running. He has represented Eritrea at the Olympics on four occasions; in 2000, 2004, 2008 and 2012. He has also competed at World Championship-level in cross country, road running, and on the track indoors and outdoors.

He was the bronze medallist in the half marathon at the 2007 All-Africa Games and the 2005 IAAF World Half Marathon Championships. His personal bests include 59:30 minutes for the half marathon and 2:07:34 hours for the marathon (an Eritrean record).

== Career ==
Kifle was born in Adi Billai in Eritrea's Debub Region. He made his first international appearance for Eritrea at the age of 21, running in the 3000 metres at the 1999 IAAF World Indoor Championships. He finished in last place and was over twenty seconds behind the rest of the runners. His first international outdoor competition followed later that year and he ran in the heats of the 5000 metres at the 1999 World Championships in Athletics in Seville. In 2000 he came 61st at the 2000 IAAF World Cross Country Championships and made his Olympic debut with a performance in the heats of the 10,000 metres at the 2000 Sydney Olympics. He began to improve from the 2002 season onwards: he was eighth in the long race at the 2000 IAAF World Cross Country Championships, fourth at the 2002 IAAF World Half Marathon Championships with a time of 1:01:05 hours, and came sixth over 5000 m at the 2002 African Championships in Athletics. He also won the Cursa de Bombers 10K in Spain that year.

Kifle was injured in the 2003 season, but came back in 2004 with a top ten finish at the 2004 IAAF World Cross Country Championships and a second Olympic appearance on the track, taking 16th in the 10,000 m final at the 2004 Athens Olympics. He was eleventh in the 10,000 m at the 2005 World Championships in Athletics and won his first major individual medal with a third-place finish at the 2005 IAAF World Half Marathon Championships. He made the top ten at both the 2006 IAAF World Cross Country Championships and 2006 IAAF World Road Running Championships. He had some of his best half marathon performances in 2007, including a bronze medal at the 2007 All-Africa Games and set a significant personal best of 59:30 minutes to take fifth at the 2007 IAAF World Road Running Championships.

On his marathon debut, he was fifth at the 2007 Amsterdam Marathon with a personal best time of 2:07:34 hours – an Eritrean record. At the 2008 London Marathon he ran a time of 2:08:51 for seventh place.

Kifle attempted his first Olympic marathon at the 2008 Beijing Games, but he could only manage 36th place overall. He was seventh for a second year running at the 2009 London Marathon having finished in 2:08:28. He took part in the marathon at the 2009 World Championships in Athletics and was in contention up to the 30 km but he dropped out soon after and did not finish the race.

He ran at the 2010 London Marathon and finished in ninth place with a time of 2:14:39, behind compatriot Zersenay Tadese. Kifle was chosen to compete at the 2011 World Championships in Athletics, but he failed to finish the men's marathon race. He ran his best time since 2009 at the 2012 Seoul International Marathon (2:08:51) and he was the only non-Kenyan runner to feature in the top ten. At the 2012 Summer Olympics he finished in 58th place.

== Achievements ==
Year	Competition	Venue	Position	Event	Notes
1999	World Indoor Championships	Maebashi, Japan	13th	3000 m	
1999	World Championships	Seville, Spain	13th (heats)	5000 m	
2000	World Cross Country Championships	Vilamoura, Portugal	61st	Long race	
2000	Summer Olympics	Sydney, Australia	14th (heats)	10,000 m	
2001	World Cross Country Championships	Ostend, Belgium	42nd	Long race	
2001	World Championships	Edmonton, Canada	10th (heats)	5000 m	
2002	World Cross Country Championships	Dublin, Ireland	8th	Long race	
2002	African Championships	Radès, Tunisia	6th	5000 m	
2002	World Half Marathon Championships	Brussels, Belgium	4th	Half marathon	1:01:05 PB
2004	World Cross Country Championships	Brussels, Belgium	9th	Long race	
2004	World Cross Country Championships	Brussels, Belgium	3rd	Team competition	
2004	Summer Olympics	Athens, Greece	16th	10,000 metres	
2004	World Half Marathon Championships	New Delhi, India	11th	Half marathon	
2005	World Championships	Helsinki, Finland	11th	10,000 m	27:35.72 PB
2005	World Half Marathon Championships	Edmonton, Canada	3rd	Half marathon	
2006	World Cross Country Championships	Fukuoka, Japan	7th	Long race	
2006	World Cross Country Championships	Fukuoka, Japan	2nd	Team competition	
2006	World Road Running Championships	Debrecen, Hungary	10th	20 km Individual	
2006	World Road Running Championships	Debrecen, Hungary	2nd	20 km Team	
2007	All-Africa Games	Algiers, Algeria	3rd	Half marathon	
2007	World Road Running Championships	Udine, Italy	7th	Half marathon	
2008	World Cross Country Championships	Edinburgh, Scotland	20th	Senior race	
2008	Summer Olympics	Beijing, China	36th	Marathon	
2009	World Championships	Berlin, Germany	DNF	Marathon	
2011	World Championships	Daegu, South Korea	DNF	Marathon	
2012	Summer Olympics	London, United Kingdom	58th	Marathon	

=== Personal bests ===
- 3000 metres - 7:53.02 min (2002)
- 5000 metres - 13:17.72 min (2002)
- 10,000 metres - 27:35.72 min (2005)
- Half marathon - 59:30 min (2007)
- Marathon - 2:07:34 (2007)

Olympic Games
Preceded by Nebiat Habtemariam	Flagbearer for Eritrea; Athens 2004	Succeeded by Simret Sultan
