= Nebiat Habtemariam =

Eritrean long-distance runner

Nebiat Habtemariam Measho (born 29 December 1978) is an Eritrean long-distance runner who specializes in the marathon. She was the first woman to represent Eritrea at the Olympics. Earlier in her career, she ran the 5000 metres and cross-country running. She is a three-time participant at the Summer Olympics. She has a marathon best of 2:32:04 hours set at the 2008 Hamburg Marathon, where she was seventh.

Born in Eritrea, Seraye, Adiquala, Adi-Kinzinab, she has competed at the World Cross Country Championships in 2000, 2001, 2002, 2003, 2004, 2007 and 2011. Her best placing is a sixteenth place from 2003.

In 5000 metres she has competed in the 1997, 1999 and 2001 World Championships in Athletics as well as the 2000 and 2004 Summer Olympics. At the 2008 Beijing Olympics she finished 47th in the Women's Marathon. She was selected for the marathon at the 2013 World Championships in Athletics.

She came third at the 2012 Milan Marathon in her first competitive outing over the distance in over three years.

== International competitions ==
Year	Competition	Venue	Position	Event	Notes
Representing Eritrea
2000	Olympic Games	Sydney, Australia	15th	5000 metres	
2004	Olympic Games	Athens, Greece	20th	5000 metres	
2008	Olympic Games	Beijing, PR China	47th	Marathon	2:37:03
2015	World Championships	Beijing, China	34th	Marathon	2:44:42

== Personal bests ==
- 1500 metres - 4:34.36 min (2003)
- 3000 metres - 9:28.01 min (2002)
- 5000 metres - 15:50.18 min (2001)
- Half marathon - 1:14:54 hrs (2003)
- Marathon - 2:32:04 hrs (2008)

Olympic Games
Preceded by First	Flagbearer for Eritrea; Sydney 2000	Succeeded by Yonas Kifle
