= Eritrean National Olympic Committee =

National Olympic Committee of Eritrea

- Country: Eritrea
- Code: ERI
- Created: 1996
- Recognized: 1999
- Continental Association: ANOCA
- Headquarters: Asmara
- President: Luul Fisshaye
- Secretary General: Amine Teclay
- Website: erinoc.org

The Eritrean National Olympic Committee (Tigrinya: ሃገራዊ ኮሚቴ ኦሎምፒክ ኤርትራ; IOC code: ERI) is the National Olympic Committee representing Eritrea. It was created in 1996 and recognised by the International Olympic Committee in 1999.

Eritrea made its debut at the 2000 Summer Olympics in Sydney where it sent three athletes to compete in track and field events. In the 2018 Winter Games, athlete Shannon-Ogbani Abeda represented the country in skiing.

== See also ==
- Eritrea at the Olympics
