= List of flag bearers for Zambia at the Olympics =

Zambia at the Olympics
- IOC code: ZAM
- NOC: National Olympic Committee of Zambia
- Website: www.nocz.co.zm
- Medals: Gold 0 Silver 1 Bronze 2 Total 3

Summer appearances
- 1964; 1968; 1972; 1976; 1980; 1984; 1988; 1992; 1996; 2000; 2004; 2008; 2012; 2016; 2020; 2024

Other related appearances
- Rhodesia (1960)

This is a list of flag bearers who have represented Zambia at the Olympics.

Flag bearers carry the national flag of their country at the opening ceremony of the Olympic Games.

#	Event year	Season	Flag bearer	Sport
1	1964	Summer	Trev Haynes	Marathon
2	1968	Summer		
3	1972	Summer		
4	1984	Summer	Davison Lishebo	Athletics
5	1988	Summer	Samuel Chomba	Football
6	1992	Summer	Ngozi Mwanamwambwa	Athletics
7	1996	Summer	Davis Mwale	Boxing
8	2000	Summer	Samuel Matete	Athletics
9	2004	Summer	Davis Mwale	Boxing
10	2008	Summer	Hastings Bwalya	Boxing
11	2012	Summer	Prince Mumba	Athletics
12	2016	Summer	Mathews Punza	Judo
11	2020	Summer	Everisto Mulenga	Boxing
11	2020	Summer	Tilka Paljk	Swimming
12	2024	Summer	Muzala Samukonga	Athletics
12	2024	Summer	Margaret Tembo	Boxing

== See also ==
- Zambia at the Olympics
