= List of Zambian records in athletics =

The following are the national records in athletics in Zambia maintained by Zambia Athletics (ZA).

== Outdoor ==
Key to tables: Awaiting ratification Record not kept by ZA Not ratified or later rescinded by ZA

+ = en route to a longer distance
h = hand timing
A = affected by altitude
OT = oversized track (> 200m in circumference)
a = aided road course

=== Men ===
Event	Record	Athlete	Date	Meet	Place	Ref.
100 m	9.88 A (+0.2 m/s) (Note: doubtful timing; not recognized by World Athletics)	Sydney Siame	8 April 2017	All Comers Meet	Lusaka, Zambia	
100 m	10.03 (+1.5 m/s) (Note: recognized by World Athletics)	Gerald Phiri	10 May 2014		Clermont, United States	
200 m	20.16 (+1.5 m/s)	Sydney Siame	30 June 2019	Résisprint	La Chaux-de-Fonds, Switzerland	
300 m	31.38	Muzala Samukonga	28 April 2026	Simbine Classic	Pretoria, South Africa	
400 m	44.88	Samuel Matete	9 September 1991	Rieti Grand Prix	Rieti, Italy	
400 m	44.66	Muzala Samukonga	7 August 2022	Commonwealth Games	Birmingham, United Kingdom	
400 m	43.91 A	Muzala Samukonga	29 April 2023	Botswana Golden Grand Prix	Gaborone, Botswana	
400 m	43.81	Muzala Samukonga	7 August 2024	Olympic Games	Paris, France	
400 m	43.74	Muzala Samukonga	7 August 2024	Olympic Games	Paris, France	
800 m	1:46.14	Prince Mumba	1 July 2011	Harry Jerome Classic	Burnaby, Canada	
1500 m	3:44.14	Jordan Chipangama	20 April 2012	Mt. SAC Relays	Walnut, United States	
1500 m	3:42.09	Tonny Wamulwa	3 June 2012	Memorial Luca Coscioni	Orvieto, Italy	
Mile	4:02.77	Harry Mulenga	11 April 2015	36th Sun Angel Classic	Tempe, United States	
3000 m	7:49.51	Tonny Wamulwa	6 June 2008		Turin, Italy	
5000 m	13:25.25	Obed Mutanya	18 August 2001		San Sebastian, Spain	
5 km (road)	13:40	Charles Mulinga	14 September 1997	Harvard Pilgrim	Providence, United States	
10,000 m	28:00.33	Charles Mulinga	14 April 1995	Mt. SAC Relays	Walnut, United States	
10 km (road)	28:40	Fackson Nkandu	16 November 1996		Durban, South Africa	
15 km (road)	43:39	Tonny Wamulwa	31 December 2008		Luanda, Angola	
10 miles (road)	46:43	Charles Mulinga	13 April 1997	Cherry Blossom Ten Mile Run	Washington, United States	
Half marathon	1:01:30	Fackson Nkandu	24 September 1994	World Half Marathon Championships	Oslo, Norway	
Marathon	2:11:35 a	Jordan Chipangama	20 June 2015	Grandma's Marathon	Duluth, United States	
110 m hurdles	14.50	Davison Lishebo	22 July 1979		Moscow, Soviet Union	
400 m hurdles	47.10	Samuel Matete	7 August 1991	Weltklasse Zürich	Zürich, Switzerland	
3000 m steeplechase	8:25.49	Godfrey Siamusiye	16 July 1995		Birmingham, United Kingdom	
High jump	2.15 m	Shaddye Melu	9 April 2016	WAR 9	Spokane, United States	
High jump	2.20 m	Bwalya Humphrey	4 March 2018		Ndola, Zambia	
Pole vault	3.74 m	Geffory Chongo	8 June 1960		Lusaka, Rhodesia and Nyasaland	
Long jump	7.63 m	Bogger Mushanga	28 May 1976		Zanzibar City, Tanzania	
Triple jump	15.54 m	Bogger Mushanga	22 July 1978	All-Africa Games	Algiers, Algeria	
Shot put	13.73 m	Vincent Kaposa	1998		Kabwe, Zambia	
Discus throw	43.42 m	Aron Chiponda	17 October 2009		Luanshya, Zambia	
Hammer throw	35.70 m	Ivrine Gary	24 July 1976		Luanshya, Zambia	
Javelin throw	58.30 m	Msama Mpundu	17 October 2009		Luanshya, Zambia	
Decathlon	5443 pts h	Samson Mubangalala	2–3 December 1972		Dar es Salaam, Tanzania	
Decathlon	100m (wind) / Long jump (wind) / Shot put / High jump / 400m / 110m H (wind) / Discus / Pole vault / Javelin / 1500m; 12.2 / 5.79 m / 9.95 m / 1.76 m / 55.9 / 16.9 / 31.95 m / 2.84 m / 51.04 m / 4:42.6					
Decathlon	5601 pts	Samson Mubangalala	12–13 May 1973		Lusaka, Zambia	
Decathlon	100m (wind) / Long jump (wind) / Shot put / High jump / 400m / 110m H (wind) / Discus / Pole vault / Javelin / 1500m					
20 km walk (road)	2:06:11	Feston Bwalya	1 June 1991	World Race Walking Cup	San Jose, United States	
50 km walk (road)						
4 × 100 m relay	39.31	Zambia; Chidamba Hazemba; Brian Kasinda; Titus Kafunda; Siame Sydney	14 September 2015	All-Africa Games	Brazzaville, Republic of the Congo	
4 × 400 m relay	2:59.12	Zambia; Patrick Kakozi Nyambe; Kennedy Luchembe; David Mulenga; Muzala Samukonga	21 March 2024	African Games	Accra, Ghana	

=== Women ===
Event	Record	Athlete	Date	Meet	Place	Ref.
100 m	11.12 A (−0.5 m/s)	Rhoda Njobvu	20 March 2021	All Comers Meet	Lusaka, Zambia	
200 m	22.65 A NWI	Rhoda Njobvu	12 June 2021		Gaborone, Botswana	
400 m	50.22	Kabange Mupopo	15 September 2015	African Games	Brazzaville, Republic of the Congo	
800 m	2:05.57	Elizet Banda	16 August 2006	World Junior Championships	Beijing, China	
800 m	2:00.10	Felistus Mpande	22 February 2020	All Comers Meet	Ndola, Zambia	
1500 m	4:16.8	Evelyn Musonda	18 August 1990		Luanshya, Zambia	
3000 m	9:40.8+	Mirriam Kaumba	7 April 2005		Austin, United States	
5000 m	15:47.58	Mirian Kaumba	1 May 2005	Payton Jordan Stanford Invitational	Palo Alto, United States	
5 km (road)	15:25	Mirriam Kaumba	4 July 2006	Firecracker Fast	Little Rock, United States	
10,000 m	34:46.4	Mirian Kaumba	16 April 2005		Wichita, United States	
15 km (road)	52:21	Elizet Banda	31 December 2008		Luanda, Angola	
Half marathon	1:19:07	Elizet Banda	11 October 2009	World Half Marathon Championships	Birmingham, United Kingdom	
Marathon	3:04:47	Mercy Kalunga	24 January 2014	Dubai Marathon	Dubai, United Arab Emirates	
Marathon	2:46:16	Elizabeth Mukoloma	28 April 2024		Lusaka, Zambia	
100 m hurdles	19.51	Rabecca Chisanga	7 May 2005		Windhoek, Namibia	
400 m hurdles	1:10.65	Exildah Bunda	20 October 1995		Windhoek, Namibia	
3000 m steeplechase						
High jump	1.70 m	Caromella Mumbi	29 May 1976		Zanzibar City, Tanzania	
Pole vault						
Long jump	5.89 m	Caromella Mumbi	28 May 1976		Zanzibar City, Tanzania	
Triple jump	11.06 m	Victoria Mwase	29 September 1991		Kabwe, Zambia	
Shot put	12.50 m	Mary Ewambo	17 June 2016		Lusaka, Zambia	
Discus throw	36.30 m	Mary Kangwa	17 May 1992		Kitwe, Zambia	
Hammer throw						
Javelin throw	50.55 m	Miriam Mukulama	20 July 2007	All-Africa Games	Algiers, Algeria	
Heptathlon	3125 pts h	Carol Muwowo	26–27 August 1989		Luanshya, Zambia	
Heptathlon	100m H (wind) / High jump / Shot put / 200m (wind) / Long jump (wind) / Javelin / 800m					
20 km walk (road)						
50 km walk (road)						
4 × 100 m relay	44.97	Zambia; Kabange Mupopo; Rhoda Njobvu; Yvonne Nalishuwa; Lumeka Katundu	15 September 2015	All-Africa Games	Brazzaville, Republic of the Congo	
4 × 100 m relay	43.85 A	ZCSA; Rhoda Njobvu; Lumeka Katundu; Suwilanji Mpondela; Hellen Makumba	11 April 2021	All Comers Meet	Lusaka, Zambia	
4 × 400 m relay	3:33.69	Zambia	27 September 2014		Lusaka, Zambia	
4 × 400 m relay	3:31.85	Zambia	22 March 2024	African Games	Accra, Ghana	

=== Mixed ===
Event	Record	Athlete	Date	Meet	Place	Ref.
4 × 400 m relay	3:27.06	Zambia Abygirl Sepiso	9 June 2022	African Championships	Saint Pierre, Mauritius	

== Indoor ==
=== Men ===
Event	Record	Athlete	Date	Meet	Place	Ref.
55 m	6.20	Gerald Phiri	17 January 2014	Jimmy Carnes Invitational	Gainesville, United States	
60 m	6.52	Gerald Phiri	8 March 2014	World Championships	Sopot, Poland	
200 m	20.80	Gerald Phiri	22 January 2011	Texas A&M vs LSU Dual	College Station, United States	
400 m	46.83	Samuel Matete	7 March 1998		Indianapolis, United States	
400 m	46.73	Kennedy Luchembe	21 February 2020	Villa de Madrid Indoor Meeting	Madrid, Spain	
500 m	1:02.04	Davison Lishebo	9 March 1986		Princeton, United States	
600 m	1:18.09	Godfrey Chama	3 March 2018	NJCAA Championships	Lubbock, United States	
800 m	1:47.73	Prince Mumba	2 March 2007	Arkansas Last Chance	Fayetteville, United States	
800 m	1:47.19 OT	Prince Mumba	11 February 2006		Ames, United States	
1500 m	3:46.01	Jordan Chipangama	10 March 2006	World Championships	Moscow, Russia	
3000 m	7:57.21	Obed Mutanya	10 March 2007	NCAA Division I Championships	Fayetteville, United States	
3000 m	7:55.24 OT	Obed Mutanya	24 February 2007		Seattle, United States	
5000 m	13:50.49	Godfrey Siamusiye	8 March 1996		Indianapolis, United States	
5000 m	13:45.51	Charles Mulinga	11 March 1995	NCAA Division II Championships	Indianapolis, United States	
60 m hurdles	8.4	Davison Lishebo	13 March 1976		Cosford, United Kingdom	
High jump	1.96 m	Mutale Mulenga	21 March 1986		Cosford, United Kingdom	
High jump	2.09 m	Shaddye Melu	18 January 2014	UW Indoor Preview	Seattle, United States	
Pole vault						
Long jump						
Triple jump						
Shot put						
Heptathlon						
Heptathlon	60m / Long jump / Shot put / High jump / 60m H / Pole vault / 1000m					
5000 m walk						
4 × 400 m relay						

=== Women ===
Event	Record	Athlete	Date	Meet	Place	Ref.
60 m	7.94	Lillian Matomola	24 February 2016	Newham Athletics Network	Newham, United Kingdom	
200 m	27.32	Kinah Chikontwe	4 March 1989	World Championships	Budapest, Hungary	
400 m	52.68	Kabange Mupopo	18 March 2016	World Championships	Portland, United States	
800 m	2:08.24	Adeh Mwamba	12 March 2005		Boston, United States	
1500 m						
Mile	4:44.89+	Miriam Kaumba	17 February 2006		Lincoln, United States	
3000 m	9:15.43 (Note: outdoor mark ratified as absolute record)	Miriam Kaumba	17 February 2006		Lincoln, United States	
5000 m	16:20.97 OT	Miriam Kaumba	5 March 2005		Johnson City, United States	
60 m hurdles						
High jump						
Pole vault						
Long jump	4.07 m	Marie-Claude Morice	23 February 2014		Lyon, France	
Triple jump						
Shot put						
Pentathlon						
Pentathlon	60m H / High jump / Shot put / Long jump / 800m					
3000 m walk						
4 × 400 m relay						
