= Zambia at the 2016 Summer Olympics =

- IOC code: ZAM
- NOC: National Olympic Committee of Zambia
- Website: www.nocz.co.zm

in Rio de Janeiro
- Competitors: 7 in 4 sports
- Flag bearer: Mathews Punza
- Medals: Gold 0 Silver 0 Bronze 0 Total 0

Summer Olympics appearances (overview)
- 1964; 1968; 1972; 1976; 1980; 1984; 1988; 1992; 1996; 2000; 2004; 2008; 2012; 2016; 2020; 2024

Other related appearances
- Rhodesia (1960)

Zambia competed at the 2016 Summer Olympics in Rio de Janeiro, Brazil, from 5 to 21 August 2016. This was the nation's thirteenth appearance at the Summer Olympics, although it marked its official debut in 1964 under the name Northern Rhodesia. Zambia missed the 1976 Summer Olympics in Montreal, because of its partial support to the African boycott.

The National Olympic Committee of Zambia (NOCZ) sent a team of seven athletes, five men and two women, to compete in four different sports at the Games, matching its roster size with London 2012. The Zambian delegation featured two returning Olympians from the previous Games, including freestyle swimmer Jade Ashleigh Howard and sprinter Gerald Phiri in the men's 100 metres. 20-year-old swimmer and 2014 Youth Olympian Ralph Goveia (men's 100 m butterfly) was Zambia's youngest competitor, while half-lightweight judoka Mathews Punza (men's 66 kg), the oldest of the team (aged 28), served as the nation's flag bearer in the opening ceremony.

Zambia, however, failed to win a single Olympic medal since the 1996 Summer Olympics in Atlanta, where Samuel Matete bagged a silver in the men's 400 m hurdles. Punza and sprinter Kabange Mupopo (women's 400 metres) were the only Zambians to progress beyond the first round of their respective sporting events at the Games, but neither of them reached the final and had the opportunity to end their nation's 20-year podium drought.

== Athletics (track and field) ==
Zambian athletes have so far achieved qualifying standards in the following athletics events (up to a maximum of 3 athletes in each event):

Track & road events

Athlete	Event	Heat		Quarterfinal		Semifinal		Final	
Athlete	Event	Result	Rank	Result	Rank	Result	Rank	Result	Rank
Jordan Chipangama	Men's marathon	—N/a						2:24:58	93
Gerald Phiri	Men's 100 m	Bye		10.27	4	Did not advance			
Kabange Mupopo	Women's 400 m	51.76	2 Q	—N/a		52.04	7	Did not advance	

Key

- Note–Ranks given for track events are within the athlete's heat only
- Q = Qualified for the next round
- q = Qualified for the next round as a fastest loser or, in field events, by position without achieving the qualifying target
- NR = National record
- SB = Seasonal best
- N/A = Round not applicable for the event
- Bye = Athlete not required to compete in round

== Boxing ==
Zambia has received an invitation from the Tripartite Commission to send a male boxer competing in the middleweight division to the Games.

Athlete	Event	Round of 32	Round of 16	Quarterfinals	Semifinals	Final	
Athlete	Event	Opposition Result	Opposition Result	Opposition Result	Opposition Result	Opposition Result	Rank
Benny Muziyo	Men's middleweight	Şipal (TUR); L 1–2	Did not advance				

== Judo ==
Zambia has qualified one judoka for the men's half-lightweight category (66 kg) at the Games. Mathews Punza earned a continental quota spot from the African region, as Zambia's top-ranked judoka outside of direct qualifying position in the IJF World Ranking List of May 30, 2016.

Athlete	Event	Round of 64	Round of 32	Round of 16	Quarterfinals	Semifinals	Repechage	Final / BM	
Athlete	Event	Opposition Result	Opposition Result	Opposition Result	Opposition Result	Opposition Result	Opposition Result	Opposition Result	Rank
Mathews Punza	Men's −66 kg	Bye	Pollack (ISR); W 100–000	Gomboč (SLO); L 000–101	Did not advance				

== Swimming ==
Zambia has received a Universality invitation from FINA to send two swimmers (one male and one female) to the Olympics.

Athlete	Event	Heat		Semifinal		Final	
Athlete	Event	Time	Rank	Time	Rank	Time	Rank
Ralph Goveia	Men's 100 m butterfly	54.84	38	Did not advance			
Jade Ashleigh Howard	Women's 100 m freestyle	58.47	35	Did not advance			
