= Zambia at the 1996 Summer Olympics =

- IOC code: ZAM
- NOC: National Olympic Committee of Zambia
- Website: www.nocz.co.zm

in Atlanta
- Competitors: 8 in 2 sports
- Flag bearer: Davis Mwale
- Medals Ranked 61st: Gold 0 Silver 1 Bronze 0 Total 1

Summer Olympics appearances (overview)
- 1964; 1968; 1972; 1976; 1980; 1984; 1988; 1992; 1996; 2000; 2004; 2008; 2012; 2016; 2020; 2024

Other related appearances
- Rhodesia (1960)

Zambia competed at the 1996 Summer Olympics in Atlanta, United States.

== Medalists ==
Medal	Name	Sport	Event	Date
Silver	Samuel Matete	Athletics	Men's 400 metres hurdles	1 August

== Competitors ==
The following is the list of number of competitors in the Games.

Sport	Men	Women	Total
Athletics	3	1	4
Boxing	4	–	4
Total	7	1	8

== Athletics ==
Men
Track and road events

Athletes	Events	Heat Round 1		Heat Round 2		Semifinal		Final	
Athletes	Events	Time	Rank	Time	Rank	Time	Rank	Time	Rank
Charles Mulinga	10000 metres	29:14.99	32	—				Did not advance	
Samuel Matete	400 metres hurdles	48.21	1 Q	—		48.28	5	47.78	Silver medal
Godfrey Siamusiye	3000 metres steeplechase	8:30.56	8 Q	—		8:37.41	21	Did not advance	

Women
Track and road events

Athletes	Events	Heat Round 1		Heat Round 2		Semifinal		Final	
Athletes	Events	Time	Rank	Time	Rank	Time	Rank	Time	Rank
Ngozi Mwanamwambwa	400 metres	54.12	42	Did not advance					

Key

- Note–Ranks given for track events are within the athlete's heat only
- Q = Qualified for the next round
- q = Qualified for the next round as a fastest loser or, in field events, by position without achieving the qualifying target
- NR = National record
- N/A = Round not applicable for the event
- Bye = Athlete not required to compete in round

== Boxing ==
Men

Athlete	Event	Round of 32	Round of 16	Quarterfinal	Semifinal	Final
Athlete	Event	Opposition Result	Opposition Result	Opposition Result	Opposition Result	Opposition Result
Boniface Mukuka	Flyweight	Zbir (MAR); W 11-4	Pakeyev (RUS); L 13-4	Did not advance		
Joseph Chongo	Bantamweight	Tseyen-Oidovyn (MGL); L 13-7	Did not advance			
Denis Zimba	Lightweight	Ostroshapkin (BLR); W RSC	Tonchev (BUL); L 17-9	Did not advance		
Davis Mwale	Light welterweight	Kevi (PNG); W 16-3	Niyazymbetov (KAZ); L 11-3	Did not advance		

== See also ==
- Zambia at the 1996 Summer Paralympics
