= Zambia at the 2012 Summer Olympics =

- IOC code: ZAM
- NOC: National Olympic Committee of Zambia
- Website: www.nocz.co.zm

in London
- Competitors: 7 in 4 sports
- Flag bearer: Prince Mumba
- Medals: Gold 0 Silver 0 Bronze 0 Total 0

Summer Olympics appearances (overview)
- 1964; 1968; 1972; 1976; 1980; 1984; 1988; 1992; 1996; 2000; 2004; 2008; 2012; 2016; 2020; 2024

Other related appearances
- Rhodesia (1960)

Zambia competed at the 2012 Summer Olympics in London, held from 27 July to 12 August 2012. The country's participation at London marked its twelfth appearance in the Summer Olympics since its début at the 1964 Summer Olympics. The delegation consisted of seven competitors; three track and field athletes Gerald Phiri, Prince Mumba and Chauzje Choosha, one each in Boxing and Judo (Gilbert Choombe and Boas Munyonga) and two swimmers, Zane Jordan and Jade Ashleigh Howard. Phiri, Mumba, Choombe and Munyonga had qualified by meeting the standards in their respective sports, and Choosha, Jordan and Howard qualified by wildcard places. Mumba was the national flag bearer at the opening and closing ceremonies.

Phiri received a bye in the men's 100 metres and was eliminated at the first round stage and recorded his best time of the 2012 athletic season. Mumba and Choosha were both eliminated from the competition in the parliamentary heats, and Choombe was defeated by Australian Jeff Horn in Boxing's round of 32. Munyonga was disqualified in his round of 32 match against Takahiro Nakai by holding his opponent's leg, a move he later regretted. Jordan failed to advance beyond the heats of the men's 100 metre backstroke despite recording a new personal best, while his female counterpart Howard was also eliminated in the same stage in the women's 100 metre freestyle.

== Background ==
Zambia has participated at twelve Olympiads from its début at the 1964 Summer Olympics in Tokyo, Japan as Northern Rhodesia and the 2012 Summer Olympics in London, England, with the exception of the 1976 Summer Olympics in Montreal, because of a boycott relating to the New Zealand national rugby union team touring South Africa. Two Zambian athletes (Keith Mwila and Samuel Matete) have won medals at the Olympic Games and the nation has yet to debut at the Winter Olympic Games. The country sent athletes Gerald Phiri, Prince Mumba and Chauzje Choosha, boxer Gilbert Choombe, judoka Boas Munyonga and swimmers Zane Jordan and Jade Ashleigh Howard to London. The Zambian team's delegation was led by the country's NOC president Gabriel Muyinda. Mumba was the flag bearer for both the opening and closing ceremonies.

Zambia's sports minister Chishimba Kambwili stated that the country's national government did not expect their athletes to win any medals at the London Games but would help build a team for future games and expose them to international media. The country's NOC secretary general Hazel Kennedy said it was "comforting" that the team sent athletes who had qualified on merit rather than a majority on wildcards. The Daily Telegraph reported that Mumba and Phiri were Zambia's best chances of achieving success. The team elected to train at the Palace of Art Centre for Sport Excellence and Scotstoun Stadium in Glasgow for two weeks.

== Athletics ==
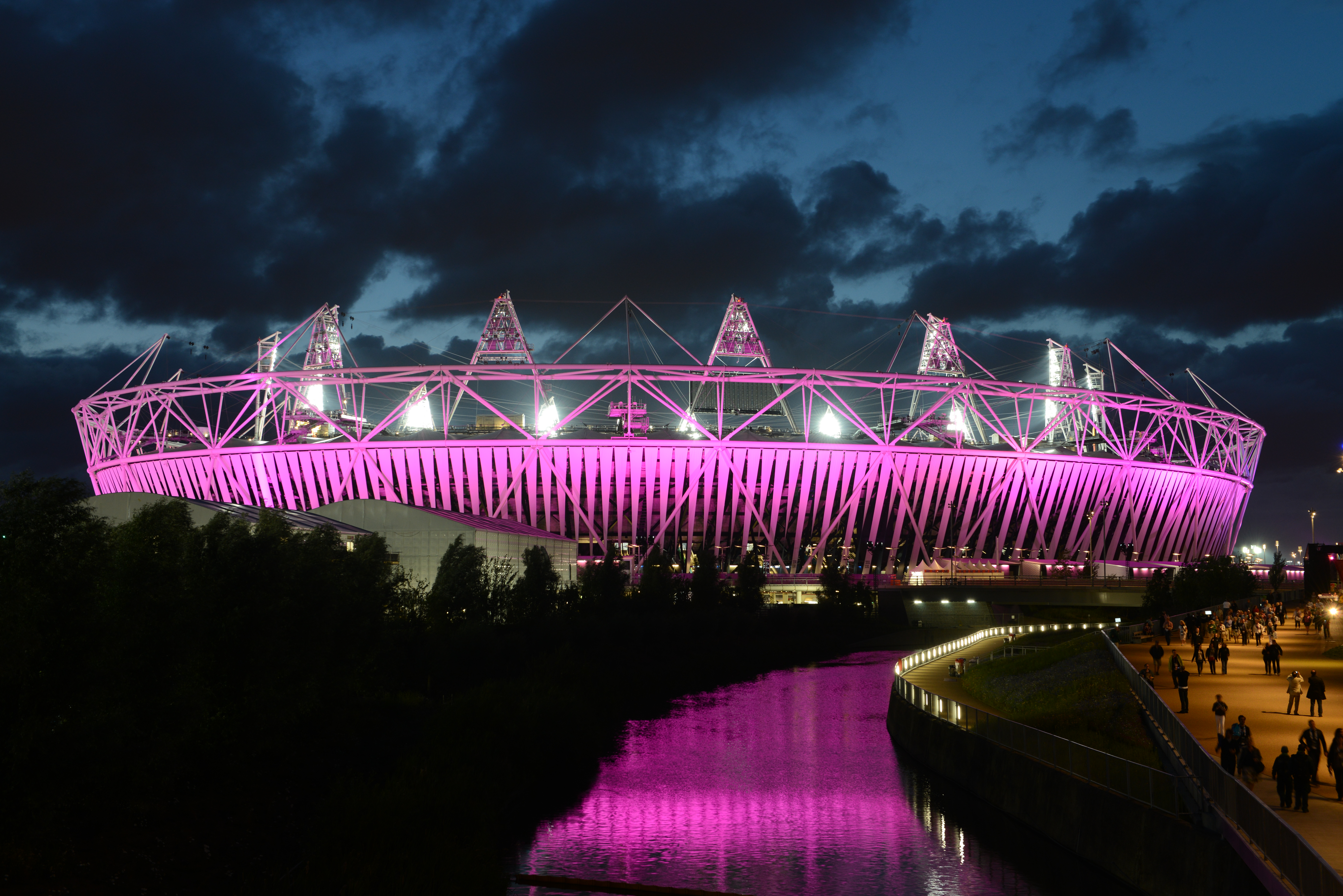
The London Olympic Stadium, where Phiri, Mumba, Choosha and competed in track and field events.

Gerald Phiri made his Olympian debut at the age of 23. He qualified for the Games because his personal best time of 10.06 seconds for the men's 100 metres, set at the 2011 Texas Relays, exceeded the "A" standard qualifying entry time. In preparation for the event, he trained with his coach in the Netherlands while adapting to a different climate and a new time zone. Phiri received a bye to advance beyond the preliminary round. He competed in the first heat of the first round on 4 August, finishing third out of eight athletes with a time of 10:16 seconds qualifying for the semi-finals. In the semi-finals on 5 August, Phiri achieved a fifth-place finish in heat two with a time of 10:11 seconds, which was his best of the 2012 athletic season. Overall he finished 15th out of 75th athletes overall and was unable to progress further because his time was 0.09 seconds slower than the slowest qualifying finalist. After the event Phiri said he placed a large amount of pressure onto himself but was not good enough in the event. Nevertheless, he thanked his supporters.

Prince Mumba was the oldest man to compete in the athletics for Zambia at age 27. He had previously competed at the 2004 Summer Olympics in Athens, Greece. Mumba qualified for the London Games, as his personal best time of one minute and 46.14 seconds met the "B" standard for the men's 800 metres . Mumba said his aim was to reach the finals of the 800 metres and that he believed and had faith in himself. He competed in the first round of the men's 800 metres on 6 August and was drawn in the sixth heat. Mumba finished seventh with a time of 1 minute, 49.07 seconds. Mumba finished 42nd out of 52 athletes overall, (Note: Three athletes were disqualified, and one did not start.) and was 1.63 seconds behind the slowest competitor who progressed into the first round and was eliminated from the competition. After his elimination Mumba revealed that he been experiencing chest pain and coughing but did not report it as he felt his condition would improve. He stated that another factor was himself going beyond his capabilities and how quickly the event started.

At the age of 19, Chauzje Choosha made her Olympian debut. Choosha qualified via a wildcard and replaced long-distance runner Tonny Wamulwa, who withdrew before the opening of the Games because of injuries sustained in a road traffic accident on 9 July. She took part in the women's 100 metres in the preliminary round on 3 August and was drawn in heat one, finishing fourth out of eight athletes, with a time of 12:29 seconds. As of 2016, the time is her personal best. Overall she finished 57th out of 78 competitors, (Note: One athlete, Noor Hussain Al Malki, did not finish.) and did not advance into the first round because her fastest time was 0.05 seconds slower than the slowest athlete who progressed.

Key

- Note–Ranks given for track events are within the athlete's heat only
- Q = Qualified for the next round
- q = Qualified for the next round as a fastest loser or, in field events, by position without achieving the qualifying target
- N/A = Round not applicable for the event
- Bye = Athlete not required to compete in round

Men

Athlete	Event	Heat		Quarterfinal		Semifinal		Final	
Athlete	Event	Result	Rank	Result	Rank	Result	Rank	Result	Rank
Gerald Phiri	100 m	Bye		10.16	3 Q	10.11	5	Did not advance	
Prince Mumba	800 m	1:49.07	7	—N/a		Did not advance			

Women

Athlete	Event	Heat		Quarterfinal		Semifinal		Final	
Athlete	Event	Result	Rank	Result	Rank	Result	Rank	Result	Rank
Chauzje Choosha	100 m	12.29	4	Did not advance					

== Boxing ==
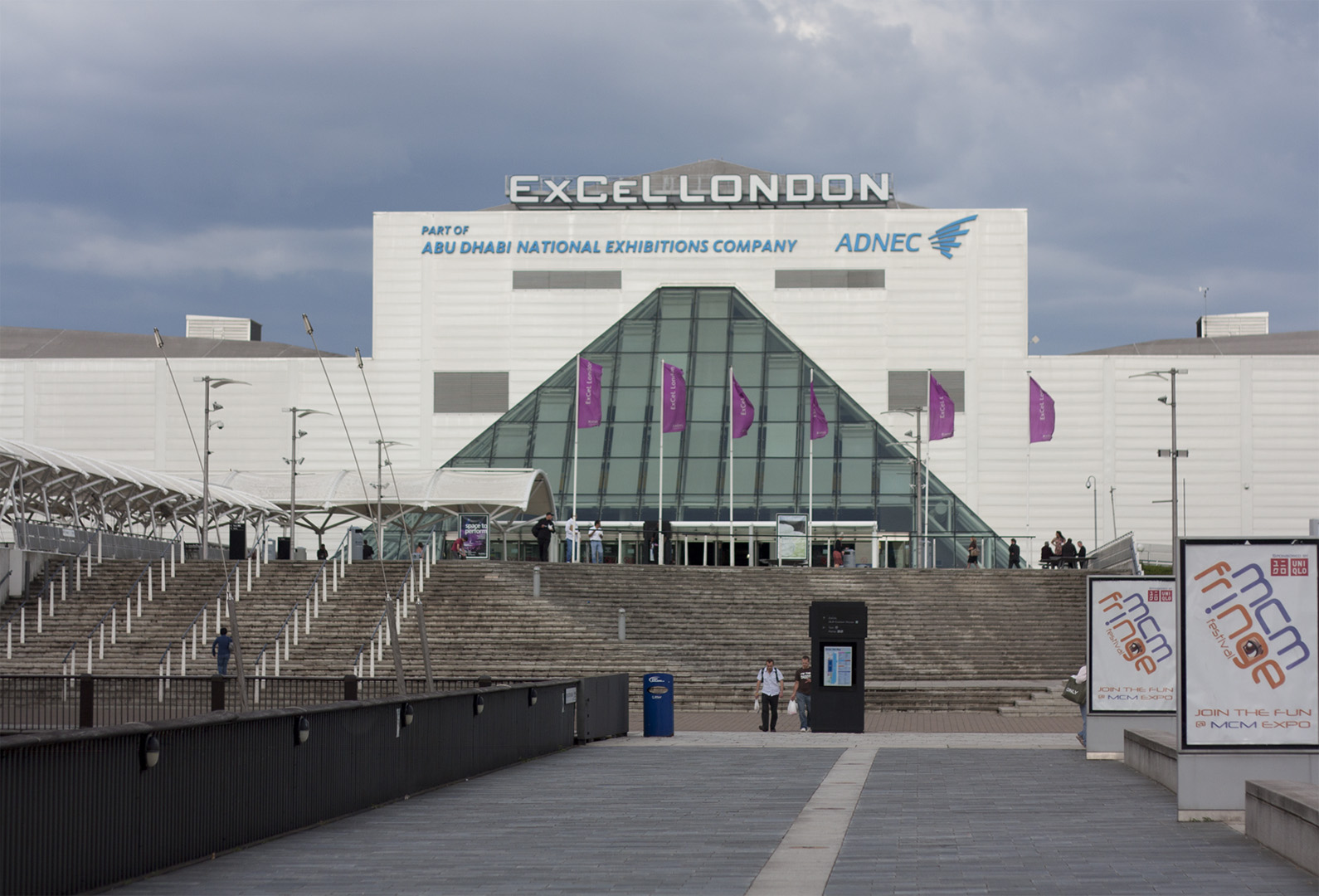
ExCeL London where Choombe took part in his boxing match against Jeff Horn.

Zambia qualified one boxer for the Olympic boxing tournament. Gilbert Choombe qualified for the men's light welterweight class at the AIBA African Olympic Qualifying Event Casablanca. He made his Olympian debut, the youngest male athlete on the Zambia Olympic delegation, at age 20. Choombe trained in Cardiff where it was affected by rain and cold weather and later adapted to hot weather conditions in London. He stated that his objective was to claim the gold medal and make Zambia proud. Choombe began the contest in the round of 32 against Australia's Jeff Horn at ExCeL London on 31 July. Horn began strongly by performing quick shots at Choombe who attempted to react by throwing back some punches but missed most of them. Horn clinched the first round 6–1, and took the second round by 4–2 when Choombe made his guard vulnerable to attack. Horn attacked consistently and by selecting his angles, he defeated Choombe 19–5. After the fight Choombe described it as "tough" and that he had a feeling of securing the victory but knew his opponent was stronger.

Men

Athlete	Event	Round of 32	Round of 16	Quarterfinals	Semifinals	Final	
Athlete	Event	Opposition Result	Opposition Result	Opposition Result	Opposition Result	Opposition Result	Rank
Gilbert Choombe	Light welterweight	Horn (AUS); L 5–19	Did not advance				

== Judo ==
Boas Munyonga represented Zambia in men's judo. He qualified by being awarded an additional place in the additional places category for the African continent by the International Judo Federation. He participated in the men's middleweight class, which includes athletes under 90 kilograms in weight. Munyonga made his Olympian debut as Zambia's oldest athlete at the London Games, at age 31. He said that he would do his best in the event. Munyonga faced Takahiro Nakai of Japan on 31 July in the round of 32. When the ball rang to signal the start of the match, Munyonga held Nakai by the leg and placed him onto the corners of the mat. The primary umpire signaled the boxers to face each other and disqualified Munyonga and declared Nakai the match's winner. Munyonga stated that he regretted the move and that he had forgotten about the rule which stated the leg was not allowed to be held by another competitor.

Athlete	Event	Round of 64	Round of 32	Round of 16	Quarterfinals	Semifinals	Repechage	Final / BM	
Athlete	Event	Opposition Result	Opposition Result	Opposition Result	Opposition Result	Opposition Result	Opposition Result	Opposition Result	Rank
Boas Munyonga	Men's −81 kg	Bye	Nakai (JPN); L 0000–1000	Did not advance					

== Swimming ==
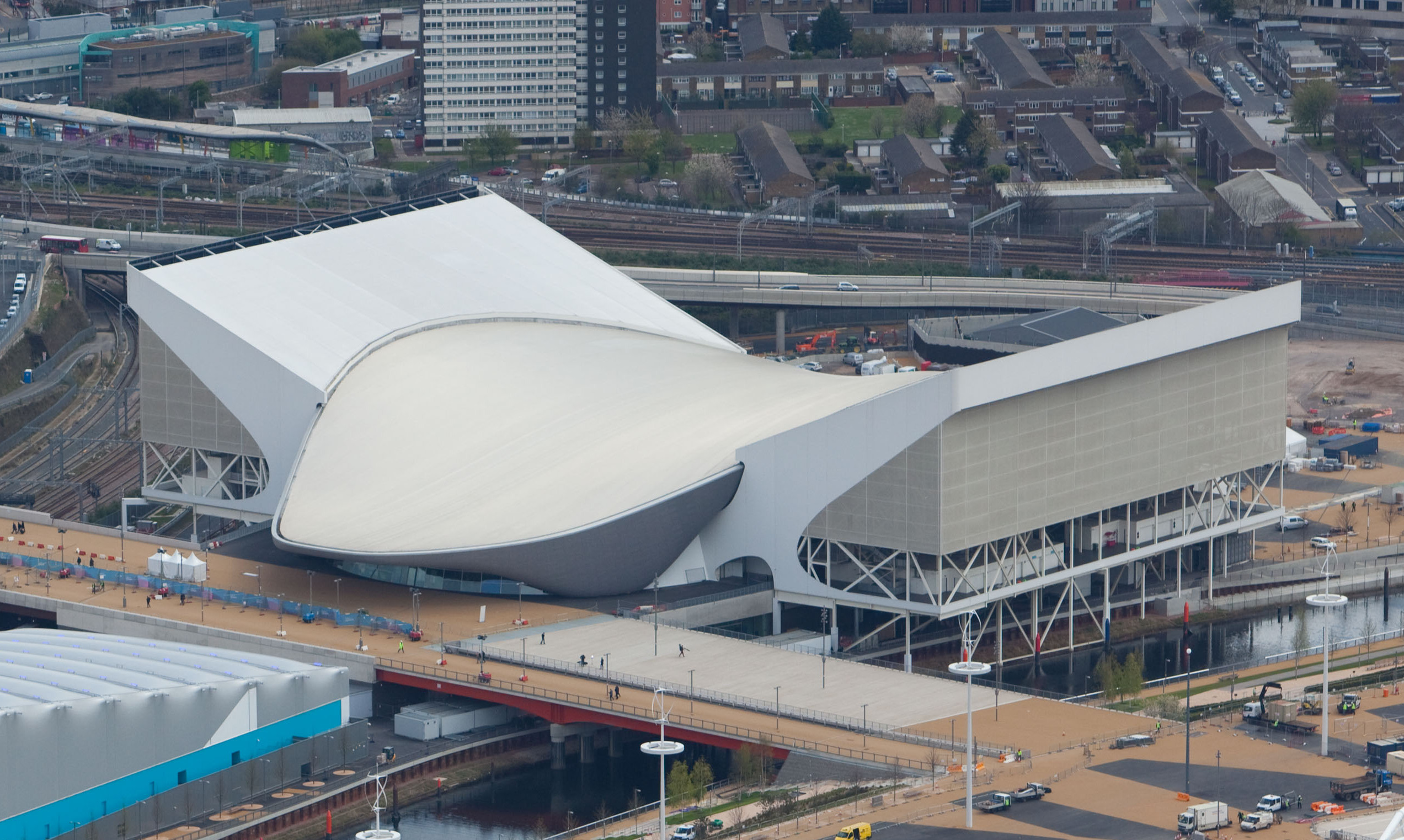
The London Aquatics Centre where Jordan and Howard competed in swimming events.

Zane Jordan was the only member of the Zambia team to be a two-time Olympian, having competed at the Beijing 2008 Summer Olympics. He qualified after receiving a universality place from FINA as his best time of 59.33 seconds was not within the "A" and "B" standard entry times. Jordan was drawn in first heat of the men's 100 metre backstroke which was held on 29 July, finishing third (and last) with a time of 58.47 seconds. He recorded a new personal best time which was 2.5 seconds faster. He finished 43rd (and last) of all swimmers who competed, and did not advance to the later stages of the 100 metres backstroke. Jordan's performance was praised by his coach Gajan Sothylingam who described it as "extremely good" and he felt that it showed that the swimmer was improving on his performance.

Jade Ashleigh Howard had the distinction of making her Olympian debut as the youngest member of the team at age 17. Like Jordan, Howard qualified after receiving a universality place from FINA, her personal best time of 1 minute, 1.24 seconds was outside the "A" and "B" qualification standard. She stated that her objective to record a new personal best time and that she was not intimidated. Howard took part in heat four of the women's 100 metre freestyle, which was held on 1 August, finishing first out of seven swimmers, with a time of 59.35 seconds. Despite the victory, she finished 39th out of 48 swimmers who competed, (Note: Two swimmers, Cate Campbell and Therese Alshammar, did not start.) and did not advance to the later stages of the women's 100 metre freestyle. Nevertheless, Howard achieved her objective of setting a new personal best time, and became the first Zambian swimmer to set a fastest time under one minute.

Men

Athlete	Event	Heat		Semifinal		Final	
Athlete	Event	Time	Rank	Time	Rank	Time	Rank
Zane Jordan	100 m backstroke	58.47	43	Did not advance			

Women

Athlete	Event	Heat		Semifinal		Final	
Athlete	Event	Time	Rank	Time	Rank	Time	Rank
Jade Ashleigh Howard	100 m freestyle	59.35	39	Did not advance			

== See also ==
- Zambia at the 2012 Summer Paralympics
