= Zambia at the 1984 Summer Olympics =

- IOC code: ZAM
- NOC: National Olympic Committee of Zambia

in Los Angeles, United States 28 July–12 August 1984
- Competitors: 16 in 3 sports
- Flag bearer: Davison Lishebo
- Officials: 5
- Medals Ranked 43rd: Gold 0 Silver 0 Bronze 1 Total 1

Summer Olympics appearances (overview)
- 1964; 1968; 1972; 1976; 1980; 1984; 1988; 1992; 1996; 2000; 2004; 2008; 2012; 2016; 2020; 2024

Other related appearances
- Rhodesia (1960)

Zambia competed at the 1984 Summer Olympics in Los Angeles, United States. The nation won its first ever Olympic medal at these Games.

== Medalists ==
Medal	Name	Sport	Event	Date
Bronze	Keith Mwila	Boxing	Men's light-flyweight	9 August

== Athletics ==
Men
Track & road events

Athlete	Event	Heat		Quarterfinal		Semifinal		Final	
Athlete	Event	Result	Rank	Result	Rank	Result	Rank	Result	Rank
Davison Lishebo	400 m	46.20	1 Q	45.57	4 Q	45.97	8	Did not advance	
Archfell Musango	800 m	1:48.84	39	Did not advance					
Archfell Musango	1500 m	3:46.99	8	Did not advance					
Henry Ngolwe	100 m	10.94	7	Did not advance					
Henry Ngolwe	200 m	21.58	6	Did not advance					

Field events

Athlete	Event	Qualification		Final	
Athlete	Event	Distance	Position	Distance	Position
Mutale Mulenga	High jump	2.05	28	Did not advance	

== Boxing ==
Men

Athlete	Event	1 Round	2 Round	3 Round	Quarterfinals	Semifinals	Final	
Athlete	Event	Opposition Result	Opposition Result	Opposition Result	Opposition Result	Opposition Result	Opposition Result	Rank
Keith Mwila	Light Flyweight	—N/a	BYE	Pao-Ming Chung (TPE); W TKO-2	Mamoru Kuroiwa (JPN); W 5-0	Salvatore Todisco (ITA); L 0-5	Did not advance	Bronze medal
Patrick Mwamba (Note: also competed at the 1988 Summer Olympics)	Flyweight	—N/a	Ibrahim Bilali (KEN); L 2-3	Did not advance				
Star Zulu	Bantamweight	BYE	Gustavo Cruz (NCA); W 5-0	Maurizio Stecca (ITA); L 0-5	Did not advance			
Chris Mwamba	Featherweight	BYE	Abraham Mieses (DOM); L 1-4	Did not advance				
Jaineck Chinyanta	Lightweight	BYE	Errol Phillip (GRN); W RSC-2	Fahri Sumer (TUR); L 0-5	Did not advance			
Dimus Chisala	Light Welterweight	Charles Nwokolo (NGR); L 0-5	Did not advance					
Henry Kalunga	Welterweight	BYE	Kamel Abboud (ALG); L 0-5	Did not advance				
Christopher Kapopo	Light Middleweight	BYE	Richard Finch (AUS); W 4-1	Abdellah Tibazi (MAR); W 3-2	Frank Tate (USA); L RSC-1	Did not advance		5
Moses Mwaba	Middleweight	—N/a	BYE	Vincent Sarnelli (FRA); W TKO-1	Mohamed Zaoui (ALG); L 1-4	Did not advance		5

== Judo ==
Men

Athlete	Event	Preliminary	Round of 32	Round of 16	Quarterfinals	Semifinals	Repechage 1	Repechage 2	Repechage 3	Final / BM
Athlete	Event	Opposition Result	Opposition Result	Opposition Result	Opposition Result	Opposition Result	Opposition Result	Opposition Result	Opposition Result	Rank
James Mafuta (Note: also bronze medalist for judo (half-lightweight) at the 1987 African Games)	−60kg	—N/a	Gino Ciampa (AUS); L 0000-1000	Did not advance						
Alick Kalwihzi	−71kg	—N/a	Juan Vargas (ESA); L 0000-1000	Did not advance						
Asafu Tembo	−78kg	BYE	Seppo Myllyla (FIN); L 0000-1000	Did not advance						
