= Zambia at the Olympics =

- IOC code: ZAM
- NOC: National Olympic Committee of Zambia
- Website: www.nocz.org
- Medals Ranked 131st: Gold 0 Silver 1 Bronze 2 Total 3

Summer appearances
- 1964; 1968; 1972; 1976; 1980; 1984; 1988; 1992; 1996; 2000; 2004; 2008; 2012; 2016; 2020; 2024

Other related appearances
- Rhodesia (1960)

Zambia participated for the first time at the Olympic Games under the current name in 1968, and has since taken part in every Summer Olympic Games with the exception of 1976. Previously, it competed as Northern Rhodesia in 1964 and under the banner of Rhodesia in 1960. The nation has never competed in the Winter Olympic Games.

Zambian athletes have won three medals in three sports. Boxer Keith Mwila won the country's first Olympic medal, a bronze, in the light flyweight category at the 1984 Summer Olympics, and twelve years later, Samuel Matete secured the silver medal in the men's 400 metres hurdles. The third medal was a bronze won by Muzala Samukonga in the men's 400 metres sprint at the 2024 Summer Olympics.

The National Olympic Committee of Zambia (NOCZ) was created in 1951 and recognised by the International Olympic Committee in 1963.

== Medal tables ==
=== Medals by Summer Games ===
| Games | Athletes | Gold | Silver | Bronze | Total | Rank |
| 1960 Rome | as part of Rhodesia | | | | | |
| 1964 Tokyo | 12 | 0 | 0 | 0 | 0 | – |
| 1968 Mexico City | 7 | 0 | 0 | 0 | 0 | – |
| 1972 Munich | 14 | 0 | 0 | 0 | 0 | – |
| 1976 Montreal | did not participate | | | | | |
| 1980 Moscow | 40 | 0 | 0 | 0 | 0 | – |
| 1984 Los Angeles | 16 | 0 | 0 | 1 | 1 | 43 |
| 1988 Seoul | 31 | 0 | 0 | 0 | 0 | – |
| 1992 Barcelona | 9 | 0 | 0 | 0 | 0 | – |
| 1996 Atlanta | 8 | 0 | 1 | 0 | 1 | 61 |
| 2000 Sydney | 8 | 0 | 0 | 0 | 0 | – |
| 2004 Athens | 6 | 0 | 0 | 0 | 0 | – |
| 2008 Beijing | 8 | 0 | 0 | 0 | 0 | – |
| 2012 London | 7 | 0 | 0 | 0 | 0 | – |
| 2016 Rio de Janeiro | 7 | 0 | 0 | 0 | 0 | – |
| 2020 Tokyo | 30 | 0 | 0 | 0 | 0 | – |
| 2024 Paris | 27 | 0 | 0 | 1 | 1 | 84 |
| 2028 Los Angeles | future event | | | | | |
| 2032 Brisbane | future event | | | | | |
| Total | | 0 | 1 | 2 | 3 | 131 |

=== Medals by sport ===
| Sport | Gold | Silver | Bronze | Total |
|---|---|---|---|---|
| Athletics | 0 | 1 | 1 | 2 |
| Boxing | 0 | 0 | 1 | 1 |
| Totals (2 entries) | 0 | 1 | 2 | 3 |

== List of medalists ==
| Medal | Name | Games | Sport | Event |
|---|---|---|---|---|
| Silver | Samuel Matete | 1996 Atlanta | Athletics | Men's 400 metres hurdles |
| Bronze | Keith Mwila | 1984 Los Angeles | Boxing | Light flyweight (–48 kg) |
| Bronze | Muzala Samukonga | 2024 Paris | Athletics | Men's 400 metres |

== See also ==
- Zambia at the Paralympics
- List of flag bearers for Zambia at the Olympics
