= Zambia at the 2004 Summer Olympics =

- IOC code: ZAM
- NOC: National Olympic Committee of Zambia
- Website: www.nocz.co.zm

in Athens
- Competitors: 6 in 3 sports
- Flag bearer: Davis Mwale
- Medals: Gold 0 Silver 0 Bronze 0 Total 0

Summer Olympics appearances (overview)
- 1964; 1968; 1972; 1976; 1980; 1984; 1988; 1992; 1996; 2000; 2004; 2008; 2012; 2016; 2020; 2024

Other related appearances
- Rhodesia (1960)

Zambia competed at the 2004 Summer Olympics in Athens, Greece, from 13 to 29 August 2004.

== Athletics ==
Zambian athletes have so far achieved qualifying standards in the following athletics events (up to a maximum of 3 athletes in each event at the 'A' Standard, and 1 at the 'B' Standard).

Men

Athlete	Event	Heat		Semifinal		Final	
Athlete	Event	Result	Rank	Result	Rank	Result	Rank
Prince Mumba	800 m	1:48.36	6	did not advance			

Women

Athlete	Event	Heat		Quarterfinal		Semifinal		Final	
Athlete	Event	Result	Rank	Result	Rank	Result	Rank	Result	Rank
Carol Mokola	100 m	12.35	7	did not advance					

Key

- Note–Ranks given for track events are within the athlete's heat only
- Q = Qualified for the next round
- q = Qualified for the next round as a fastest loser or, in field events, by position without achieving the qualifying target
- NR = National record
- N/A = Round not applicable for the event
- Bye = Athlete not required to compete in round

== Boxing ==
Davis Mwale qualified at the 2003 All-Africa Games in Abuja, while Ellis Chibuye qualified at the African Boxing Championships in Botswana.

Athlete	Event	Round of 32	Round of 16	Quarterfinals	Semifinals	Final	
Athlete	Event	Opposition Result	Opposition Result	Opposition Result	Opposition Result	Opposition Result	Rank
Davis Mwale	Light welterweight	Bye	Johnson (CUB); L RSC	did not advance			
Ellis Chibuye	Welterweight	Ulusoy (TUR); L 32–45	did not advance				

== Swimming ==
Zambia selected two swimmers under the Universality rule.

Men

Athlete	Event	Heat		Semifinal		Final	
Athlete	Event	Time	Rank	Time	Rank	Time	Rank
Chisela Kanchela	100 m breaststroke	1:09.95	57	did not advance			

Women

Athlete	Event	Heat		Semifinal		Final	
Athlete	Event	Time	Rank	Time	Rank	Time	Rank
Jakie Wellman	50 m freestyle	28.56	50	did not advance			
