= Fackson =

Fackson is a Zambian male given name. Notable people with the name include:

- Fackson Kapumbu (born 1990), Zambian footballer
- Fackson Nkandu (born 1971), Zambian long-distance runner
- Fackson Shamenda (born 1950), Zambian trade unionist and politician
