= Zambia at the 2008 Summer Olympics =

- IOC code: ZAM
- NOC: National Olympic Committee of Zambia
- Website: www.nocz.co.zm

in Beijing
- Competitors: 8 in 4 sports
- Flag bearers: Hastings Bwalya (opening); Rachael Nachula (closing)
- Medals: Gold 0 Silver 0 Bronze 0 Total 0

Summer Olympics appearances (overview)
- 1964; 1968; 1972; 1976; 1980; 1984; 1988; 1992; 1996; 2000; 2004; 2008; 2012; 2016; 2020; 2024

Other related appearances
- Rhodesia (1960)

Zambia competed in the 2008 Summer Olympics in Beijing, the People's Republic of China, sending eight athletes to the competition. The use of Simplified Chinese stroke count placed it last before the host nation in the Parade of Nations as it takes sixteen strokes to write the first character and four to write the second.

== Athletics ==
One of the two Zambian athletes managed to advance beyond the opening heats, Rachael Nachula in the women's 400 metres. In her semifinal, however, Nachula finished last and did not make the final.

Men

Athlete	Event	Heat		Final	
Athlete	Event	Result	Rank	Result	Rank
Tonny Wamulwa	5000 m	14:06.96	10	Did not advance	

Women

Athlete	Event	Heat		Semifinal		Final	
Athlete	Event	Result	Rank	Result	Rank	Result	Rank
Rachael Nachula	400 m	51.62	3 Q	52.67	8	Did not advance	

Key

- Note–Ranks given for track events are within the athlete's heat only
- Q = Qualified for the next round
- q = Qualified for the next round as a fastest loser or, in field events, by position without achieving the qualifying target
- NR = National record
- N/A = Round not applicable for the event
- Bye = Athlete not required to compete in round

== Badminton ==
Athlete	Event	Round of 64	Round of 32	Round of 16	Quarterfinal	Semifinal	Final / BM	
Athlete	Event	Opposition Score	Opposition Score	Opposition Score	Opposition Score	Opposition Score	Opposition Score	Rank
Eli Mambwe	Men's singles	Bye	Kehlhoffner (FRA); L 15–21, 17–21	Did not advance				

== Boxing ==
Zambia qualified two boxers for the Olympic boxing tournament. Bwalya qualified at the first African qualifying tournament. Chiyanika earned his spot at the second qualifier. All three lost their first bouts and failed to advance.

Athlete	Event	Round of 32	Round of 16	Quarterfinals	Semifinals	Final	
Athlete	Event	Opposition Result	Opposition Result	Opposition Result	Opposition Result	Opposition Result	Rank
Cassius Chiyanika	Flyweight	Picardi (ITA); L 3–10	Did not advance				
Hastings Bwalya	Light welterweight	Mönkh-Erdene (MGL); L 8–12	Did not advance				
Precious Makina	Welterweight	Hanati (CHN); L 4–21	Did not advance				

== Swimming ==
Both Zambian swimmers participated in the 50 metre freestyle, but neither of them managed to advance past the first round.

Men

Athlete	Event	Heat		Semifinal		Final	
Athlete	Event	Time	Rank	Time	Rank	Time	Rank
Zane Jordan	50 m freestyle	24.82	63	Did not advance			

Women

Athlete	Event	Heat		Semifinal		Final	
Athlete	Event	Time	Rank	Time	Rank	Time	Rank
Ellen Lendra Hight	50 m freestyle	27.42	53	Did not advance			

Qualifiers for the latter rounds of all events are decided on a time only basis, therefore positions shown are overall results versus competitors in all heats.

== See also ==
- Zambia at the 2008 Summer Paralympics
