= Zambia at the 1992 Summer Olympics =

- IOC code: ZAM
- NOC: National Olympic Committee of Zambia

in Barcelona
- Competitors: 9 (8 men and 1 woman) in 3 sports
- Flag bearer: Ngozi Mwanamwambwa
- Officials: 5
- Medals: Gold 0 Silver 0 Bronze 0 Total 0

Summer Olympics appearances (overview)
- 1964; 1968; 1972; 1976; 1980; 1984; 1988; 1992; 1996; 2000; 2004; 2008; 2012; 2016; 2020; 2024

Other related appearances
- Rhodesia (1960)

Zambia competed at the 1992 Summer Olympics in Barcelona, Spain.

== Competitors ==
The following is the list of number of competitors in the Games.

Sport	Men	Women	Total
Athletics	3	1	4
Boxing	4	–	4
Judo	1	0	1
Total	8	1	9

== Athletics ==
Men
Track & road events

Athlete	Event	Heat		Quarterfinal		Semifinal		Final	
Athlete	Event	Result	Rank	Result	Rank	Result	Rank	Result	Rank
Cephas Lemba	400 m	45.94	3 Q	DNF		did not advance			
Samuel Matete	400 m hurdles	49.89	1 Q	DSQ		did not advance			
Godfrey Siamusiye	5000 m	14:08.83	11	did not advance					

Women
Track & road events

Athlete	Event	Heat		Quarterfinal		Semifinal		Final	
Athlete	Event	Result	Rank	Result	Rank	Result	Rank	Result	Rank
Ngozi Mwanamwambwa	100 m	12.13	46	did not advance					
Ngozi Mwanamwambwa	200 m	24.59	6	did not advance					
Ngozi Mwanamwambwa	400 m	54.88	6	did not advance					

== Boxing ==
Men

Athlete	Event	1 Round	2 Round	3 Round	Quarterfinals	Semifinals	Final	
Athlete	Event	Opposition Result	Opposition Result	Opposition Result	Opposition Result	Opposition Result	Opposition Result	Rank
Felix Bwalya	Bantamweight	BYE	Magno Ruben Ruiz (GUA); W 7-3	Serafim Todorov (BUL); L 6-18	did not advance			
Joseph Chongo	Featherweight	BYE	Paul Griffin (IRL); W RSC-2 00:26	Victoriano Damian (DOM); L 9-11	did not advance			
Steven Chungu	Lightweight	BYE	Rashid Matumla (TAN); L 8-16	did not advance				
Daniel Fulanse	Light Welterweight	BYE	Abdelkader Wahabi (BEL); W 13-3	Lászlo Szücs (HUN); L 7-15	did not advance			

== Judo ==
Men

Athlete	Event	Preliminary	Round of 32	Round of 16	Quarterfinals	Semifinals	Repechage 1	Repechage 2	Repechage 3	Repechage Final	Final / BM	
Athlete	Event	Opposition Result	Opposition Result	Opposition Result	Opposition Result	Opposition Result	Opposition Result	Opposition Result	Opposition Result	Opposition Result	Opposition Result	Rank
Leyton Mafuta	−60 kg	BYE	Willis Garcia (VEN); L 0000–1000	did not advance								

== Sources ==
- Official Olympic Reports
- Sports Reference
