= Zambia at the 2024 Summer Olympics =

- Flag of Zambia
- IOC code: ZAM
- NOC: National Olympic Committee of Zambia
- Website: www.nocz.co.zm

in Paris, France 26 July 2024 – 11 August 2024
- Competitors: 27 (7 men and 20 women) in 5 sports
- Flag bearers: Muzala Samukonga; Margaret Tembo
- Medals Ranked 84th: Gold 0 Silver 0 Bronze 1 Total 1

Summer Olympics appearances (overview)
- 1964; 1968; 1972; 1976; 1980; 1984; 1988; 1992; 1996; 2000; 2004; 2008; 2012; 2016; 2020; 2024

Other related appearances
- Rhodesia (1960)

Zambia competed at the 2024 Summer Olympics in Paris from 26 July to 11 August 2024. It was the nation's fifteenth appearance at the Summer Olympics, although it marked its official debut in 1964 under the name Northern Rhodesia, except for Montreal 1976, as the nation's joined the African boycott.

== Medalists ==
Medal	Name	Sport	Event	Date
Bronze	Muzala Samukonga	Athletics	Men's 400 m	7 August

== Competitors ==
The following is the list of number of competitors in the Games.

Sport	Men	Women	Total
Athletics	4	0	4
Boxing	1	1	2
Football	0	18	18
Judo	1	0	1
Swimming	1	1	2
Total	7	20	27

== Athletics ==
Zambian track and field athletes achieved the entry standards for Paris 2024, either by passing the direct qualifying mark (or time for track and road races) or by world ranking, in the following events (a maximum of 3 athletes each):

Key

- Note–Ranks given for track events are within the athlete's heat only
- Q = Qualified for the next round
- q = Qualified for the next round as a fastest loser or, in field events, by position without achieving the qualifying target
- NR = National record
- N/A = Round not applicable for the event
- Bye = Athlete not required to compete in round

Track & road events

Athlete	Event	Heat		Repechage		Semifinal		Final	
Athlete	Event	Result	Rank	Result	Rank	Result	Rank	Result	Rank
Muzala Samukonga	Men's 400 m	44.56	1 Q	—N/a		43.81	2 Q	43.74 NR	3rd place, bronze medalist(s)
Kennedy Luchembe; Chanda Mulenga; Patrick Kakozi Nyambe; Muzala Samukonga	Men's 4 × 400 m relay	3:00.08	5 q	—N/a				3:02.76	8

== Boxing ==
Zambia entered two boxersinto the Olympic tournament. Tokyo 2020 Olympian, Patrick Chinyemba secured one available spot in men's flyweight division by winning final match at the 2023 African Olympic Qualification Tournament in Dakar, Senegal. Later on, Margret Tembo secured her spot in the women's flyweight division, through the allocations of universality spots.

Athlete	Event	Round of 32	Round of 16	Quarterfinals	Semifinals	Final	
Athlete	Event	Opposition Result	Opposition Result	Opposition Result	Opposition Result	Opposition Result	Rank
Patrick Chinyemba	Men's 51 kg	Bye	Panghal (IND); W 4–1	de Pina (CPV); L 0–5	Did not advance		
Margret Tembo	Women's 50 kg	Kaivo-oja (FIN); L 0–5	Did not advance				

== Football ==
Summary

Key:

- A.E.T – After extra time.
- P – Match decided by penalty-shootout.

Team	Event	Group Stage				Quarterfinal	Semifinal	Final / BM	
Team	Event	Opposition Score	Opposition Score	Opposition Score	Rank	Opposition Score	Opposition Score	Opposition Score	Rank
Zambia women's	Women's tournament	United States; L 0–3	Australia; L 5–6	Germany; L 1–4	4	Did not advance			

=== Women's tournament ===
For the second time after 2020, Zambia women's football team qualified for the Olympics by winning the fourth round play-off of the 2024 CAF Women's Olympic qualifying tournament against Morocco.

Team roster

Zambia named a squad of 22 players for the tournament on 3 July 2024.

Head coach: Bruce Mwape

No.	Pos.	Player	Date of birth (age)	Caps	Goals	Club
1	GK	Catherine Musonda	20 February 1998 (aged 26)	3	0	(Israel Football Association) Hapoel Ra'anana
2	DF	Diana Banda	5 September 2002 (aged 21)	1	0	(Football Association of Zambia) Green Buffaloes
3	DF	Lushomo Mweemba	10 April 2001 (aged 23)	28	1	(Kazakhstan Football Federation) BIIK Shymkent
4	DF	Esther Siamfuko	8 August 2004 (aged 19)	7	0	(Football Association of Zambia) Green Buffaloes
5	DF	Pauline Zulu	3 October 2004 (aged 19)	1	0	(Football Association of Zambia) Lusaka Dynamos
6	MF	Rhoda Chileshe	8 May 1998 (aged 26)	1	1	(Football Association of Zambia) Indeni
7	MF	Misozi Zulu	11 October 1994 (aged 29)	13	0	(Turkish Football Federation) Hakkarigücü Spor
8	MF	Ochumba Lubandji	1 July 2001 (aged 23)	21	4	(Football Association of Zambia) Red Arrows
9	MF	Kabange Mupopo	21 September 1992 (aged 31)	1	0	(Football Association of Zambia) Green Buffaloes
10	MF	Grace Chanda	11 June 1997 (aged 27)	28	10	(United States Soccer Federation) Orlando Pride
11	FW	Barbra Banda	20 March 2000 (aged 24)	61	53	(United States Soccer Federation) Orlando Pride
12	MF	Avell Chitundu	30 July 1997 (aged 26)	20	3	(Football Association of Zambia) ZESCO United
13	DF	Martha Tembo	8 March 1998 (aged 26)	22	0	(Kazakhstan Football Federation) BIIK Shymkent
14	MF	Prisca Chilufya	8 June 1999 (aged 25)	0	0	(Mexican Football Federation) Juárez
15	FW	Hellen Chanda	19 June 1998 (aged 26)	1	0	(Turkish Football Federation) Hakkarigücü Spor
16	DF	Esther Muchinga	16 November 2002 (aged 21)	1	0	(Football Association of Zambia) Zanaco
17	FW	Racheal Kundananji	3 June 2000 (aged 24)	19	10	(United States Soccer Federation) Bay FC
18	GK	Ngambo Musole	26 June 1998 (aged 26)	1	0	(Football Association of Zambia) Green Buffaloes
20	FW	Racheal Nachula	14 January 1986 (aged 38)		14	(Israel Football Association) Hapoel Katamon
21	MF	Mary Wilombe	22 September 1997 (aged 26)	23	1	(Football Association of Zambia) Red Arrows

Group play

Pos	Team	Pld	W	D	L	GF	GA	GD	Pts	Qualification
1	United States	3	3	0	0	9	2	+7	9	Advance to knockout stage
2	Germany	3	2	0	1	8	5	+3	6	Advance to knockout stage
3	Australia	3	1	0	2	7	10	−3	3	
4	Zambia	3	0	0	3	6	13	−7	0	

Source: FIFA
Rules for classification: Group stage tiebreakers
25 July 2024
21:00

United States	3–0	Zambia
Rodman 17'; Swanson 24', 25'	Report

Stade de Nice, Nice
Attendance: 5,550
Referee: Ramon Abatti (Brazil)

28 July 2024
19:00

Australia	6–5	Zambia
Kennedy 7'; Raso 35'; Musole 58' (o.g.); Catley 65', 78' (pen.); Heyman 90'	Report	B. Banda 1', 33', 45+2'; Kundananji 21', 56'

Stade de Nice, Nice
Attendance: 4,441
Referee: Emikar Calderas (Venezuela)

31 July 2024
19:00

Zambia	1–4	Germany
B. Banda 49'	Report	Schüller 10', 61'; Bühl 47'; Senß 90+5'

Stade Geoffroy-Guichard, Saint-Étienne
Attendance: 2,642
Referee: Yoshimi Yamashita (Japan)

== Judo ==
Zambia qualified one judoka for the following weight class at the Games. Simon Zulu (men's extra-lightweight, 60 kg) got qualified via continental quota based on Olympic point rankings.

Athlete	Event	Round of 32	Round of 16	Quarterfinals	Semifinals	Repechage	Final / BM	
Athlete	Event	Opposition Result	Opposition Result	Opposition Result	Opposition Result	Opposition Result	Opposition Result	Rank
Simon Zulu	Men's –60 kg	Kim W-j (KOR); L 00–10	Did not advance					

== Swimming ==
Zambia sent two swimmers to compete at the 2024 Paris Olympics, through the allocation of universality places.

Athlete	Event	Heat		Semifinal		Final	
Athlete	Event	Time	Rank	Time	Rank	Time	Rank
Damien Shamambo	Men's 50 m freestyle	24.09	48	Did not advance			
Mia Phiri	Women's 50 m freestyle	26.49	32	Did not advance			
