= Chauzje Choosha =

Zambian sprinter

Chauness Chauzje Choosha (born 31 December 1992) is a Zambian sprinter. She participated in the 2012 IAAF World Indoor Championships where she established a new Zambian national record in the 60 metres, and was eliminated at the semi-final stage of the 100 metres at the African Championships in Athletics. Choosha qualified for the 2012 Summer Olympics via a wildcard and did not qualify for the preliminary round of the 100 metres.

== Early life ==
Choosha was born on 31 December 1992 in Monze, Zambia. She was educated at Musuku High School.

== Career ==
=== 2012 IAAF World Indoor and African Championships ===
Choosha made her international athletics début at the 2012 IAAF World Indoor Championships in the 60 metres, and set a new Zambian national record in the discipline, with a time of 8.19 seconds. However, she finished eighth (and last) in her heat and did not advance to the semi-finals. She later travelled to Benin to compete in the 2012 African Championships in Athletics where she participated in the 100 metres and qualified for the semi-finals with a time of 12:72 seconds, but was eliminated from competition after the semi-final round. Phiri also took part in the 200 metres but did not make the semi-final round after finishing last in her heat and 30th overall.

=== London Olympics ===
Choosha qualified for the 2012 Summer Olympics in London via a wildcard after long-distance runner Tonny Wamulwa was injured in a road traffic accident three weeks before the games started. She took part in the women's 100 meters in the preliminary round on 3 August and was drawn in heat one, finishing fourth out of eight athletes, with a time of 12:29 seconds. As of 2016, the time is her personal best. She ranked ahead of Afa Ismail from the Maldivies (12.52 seconds) and Jordan's Rima Taha (12.66 seconds) in a heat led by Feta Ahamada of the Comoros (11.81 seconds). Overall, she finished 57th out of 78 competitors, and did not advance into the first round because her fastest time was 0.05 seconds slower than the slowest athlete who progressed.
