= Zambia at the 2020 Summer Olympics =

- Flag of Zambia
- IOC code: ZAM
- NOC: National Olympic Committee of Zambia
- Website: www.nocz.co.zm

in Tokyo, Japan July 23, 2021 – August 8, 2021
- Competitors: 30 in 5 sports
- Flag bearers (opening): Tilka Paljk; Everisto Mulenga
- Flag bearer (closing): Sydney Siame
- Medals: Gold 0 Silver 0 Bronze 0 Total 0

Summer Olympics appearances (overview)
- 1964; 1968; 1972; 1976; 1980; 1984; 1988; 1992; 1996; 2000; 2004; 2008; 2012; 2016; 2020; 2024

Other related appearances
- Rhodesia (1960)

Zambia competed at the 2020 Summer Olympics in Tokyo. Originally scheduled to take place from 24 July to 9 August 2020, the Games were postponed to 23 July to 8 August 2021, due to the COVID-19 pandemic. It was the nation's fourteenth appearance at the Summer Olympics, although it marked its official debut in 1964 under the name Northern Rhodesia.

== Competitors ==
The following is the list of number of competitors in the Games. Note that reserves in football are not counted:

Sport	Men	Women	Total
Athletics	1	1	2
Boxing	3	0	3
Football	0	22	22
Judo	1	0	1
Swimming	1	1	2
Total	6	24	30

== Athletics ==
Zambian athletes achieved the entry standards, either by qualifying time or by world ranking, in the following track and field events (up to a maximum of 3 athletes in each event):

Key

- Note–Ranks given for track events are within the athlete's heat only
- Q = Qualified for the next round
- q = Qualified for the next round as a fastest loser or, in field events, by position without achieving the qualifying target
- NR = National record
- N/A = Round not applicable for the event
- Bye = Athlete not required to compete in round

Track & road events

Athlete	Event	Heat		Quarterfinal		Semifinal		Final	
Athlete	Event	Result	Rank	Result	Rank	Result	Rank	Result	Rank
Sydney Siame	Men's 200 m	21.01	4	—N/a		Did not advance			
Roda Njobvu	Women's 100 m	Bye		11.40	4	Did not advance			
Roda Njobvu	Women's 200 m	23.33	4	—N/a		Did not advance			

== Boxing ==
Zambia entered three male boxers into the Olympic tournament. Patrick Chinyemba (men's flyweight), Everisto Mulenga (men's featherweight), and Stephen Zimba (men's welterweight) secured the spots on the Zambian squad by advancing to the final match of their respective weight divisions at the 2020 African Qualification Tournament in Diamniadio, Senegal.

Athlete	Event	Round of 32	Round of 16	Quarterfinals	Semifinals	Final	
Athlete	Event	Opposition Result	Opposition Result	Opposition Result	Opposition Result	Opposition Result	Rank
Patrick Chinyemba	Men's flyweight	Winwood (AUS); W 4–1	Yafai (GBR); L 2–3	Did not advance			
Everisto Mulenga	Men's featherweight	Bye	Ávila (COL); L 2–3	Did not advance			
Stephen Zimba	Men's welterweight	Ah Tong (SAM); W 5–0	Zamkovoy (ROC); L 1–4	Did not advance			

== Football ==
Summary

Key:

- A.E.T – After extra time.
- P – Match decided by penalty-shootout.

Team	Event	Group Stage				Quarterfinal	Semifinal	Final / BM	
Team	Event	Opposition Score	Opposition Score	Opposition Score	Rank	Opposition Score	Opposition Score	Opposition Score	Rank
Zambia women's	Women's tournament	Netherlands; L 3–10	China; D 4–4	Brazil; L 0–1	3	Did not advance			

=== Women's tournament ===
Zambia women's football team qualified for the first time at the Olympics by winning the fifth and final round against Cameroon at the 2020 CAF Olympic Qualifying Tournament.

Team roster

The following 22 athletes were named on 2 July 2021.

Head coach: Bruce Mwape

No.	Pos.	Player	Date of birth (age)	Caps	Goals	Club
1	GK	Catherine Musonda	20 February 1998 (aged 23)			(Football Association of Zambia) Indeni Roses
2	DF	Fikile Khosa	24 July 1996 (aged 24)			(Football Association of Zambia) Red Arrows
3	DF	Lushomo Mweemba	10 April 2001 (aged 20)			(Football Association of Zambia) Green Buffaloes
4	DF	Esther Siamfuko	8 August 2004 (aged 16)			(Football Association of Zambia) Queens Academy
5	DF	Anita Mulenga	3 May 1995 (aged 26)			(Football Association of Zambia) Green Buffaloes
6	MF	Mary Wilombe	22 September 1997 (aged 23)			(Football Association of Zambia) Red Arrows
7	FW	Lubandji Ochumba	1 July 2001 (aged 20)			(Football Association of Zambia) Red Arrows
8	DF	Margaret Belemu	24 February 1997 (aged 24)			(Football Association of Zambia) Red Arrows
9	FW	Hellen Mubanga	23 May 1995 (aged 26)			(Royal Spanish Football Federation) Zaragoza CFF
10	MF	Grace Chanda	11 June 1997 (aged 24)			(Football Association of Zambia) Red Arrows
11	FW	Barbra Banda (captain)	20 March 2000 (aged 21)	5	9	(Chinese Football Association) Shanghai Shengli
12	FW	Avell Chitundu	30 July 1997 (aged 23)			(Football Association of Zambia) ZESCO United
13	DF	Martha Tembo	8 March 1998 (aged 23)			(Football Association of Zambia) Green Buffaloes
14	MF	Ireen Lungu	6 October 1997 (aged 23)			(Football Association of Zambia) Green Buffaloes
15	DF	Agness Musase	11 July 1997 (aged 24)			(Football Association of Zambia) Green Buffaloes
16	GK	Hazel Nali	4 April 1998 (aged 23)			(Israel Football Association) Hapoel Be'er Sheva
17	MF	Racheal Kundananji	3 June 2000 (aged 21)			(Kazakhstan Football Federation) BIIK Kazygurt
18	DF	Vast Phiri	3 February 1996 (aged 25)			(Football Association of Zambia) ZESCO United
19	MF	Evarine Katongo	29 December 2002 (aged 18)			(Football Association of Zambia) ZISD Queens
20	DF	Esther Mukwasa	24 October 1996 (aged 24)			(Football Association of Zambia) Indeni Roses
21	MF	Hellen Chanda	19 June 1998 (aged 23)			(Football Association of Zambia) Red Arrows
22	GK	Ngambo Musole	26 June 1998 (aged 23)			(Football Association of Zambia) ZESCO United

Group play

Pos	Team	Pld	W	D	L	GF	GA	GD	Pts	Qualification
1	Netherlands	3	2	1	0	21	8	+13	7	Advance to knockout stage
2	Brazil	3	2	1	0	9	3	+6	7	Advance to knockout stage
3	Zambia	3	0	1	2	7	15	−8	1	
4	China	3	0	1	2	6	17	−11	1	

Source: TOCOG and FIFA
Rules for classification: Group stage tiebreakers
21 July 2021
20:00

Zambia	3–10	Netherlands
Banda 19', 82', 83'	Report (TOCOG); Report (FIFA)	Miedema 9', 15', 29', 59'; Martens 14', 38'; Van de Sanden 44'; Roord 64'; Beerensteyn 75'; Pelova 80'

Miyagi Stadium, Rifu
Attendance: 1,822
Referee: Laura Fortunato (Argentina)

24 July 2021
17:00

China	4–4	Zambia
Wang Shuang 6', 22', 23', 84' (pen.)	Report (TOCOG); Report (FIFA)	Kundananji 15'; Banda 43' (pen.), 46', 69'

Miyagi Stadium, Rifu
Attendance: 2,212
Referee: Melissa Borjas (Honduras)

27 July 2021
20:30

Brazil	1–0	Zambia
Andressa 19'	Report (TOCOG); Report (FIFA)

Saitama Stadium 2002, Saitama
Attendance: 0
Referee: Yoshimi Yamashita (Japan)

== Judo ==
Zambia qualified one judoka for the men's half-lightweight category (66 kg) at the Games. Steven Mungandu accepted a continental berth from Africa as the nation's top-ranked judoka outside of direct qualifying position in the IJF World Ranking List of June 28, 2021.

Athlete	Event	Round of 32	Round of 16	Quarterfinals	Semifinals	Repechage	Final / BM	
Athlete	Event	Opposition Result	Opposition Result	Opposition Result	Opposition Result	Opposition Result	Opposition Result	Rank
Steven Mungandu	Men's −66 kg	Gomboc (SLO); L 00–10	Did not advance					

== Swimming ==
Zambia received a universality invitation from FINA to send two top-ranked swimmers (one per gender) in their respective individual events to the Olympics, based on the FINA Points System of June 28, 2021.

Athlete	Event	Heat		Semifinal		Final	
Athlete	Event	Time	Rank	Time	Rank	Time	Rank
Shaquille Moosa	Men's 50 m freestyle	25.54	56	Did not advance			
Tilka Paljk	Women's 50 m freestyle	27.34	52	Did not advance			
