= Zambia at the 1968 Summer Olympics =

- IOC code: ZAM
- NOC: National Olympic Committee of Zambia

in Mexico City, Mexico 12–27 October 1968
- Competitors: 7 in 2 sports
- Medals: Gold 0 Silver 0 Bronze 0 Total 0

Summer Olympics appearances (overview)
- 1964; 1968; 1972; 1976; 1980; 1984; 1988; 1992; 1996; 2000; 2004; 2008; 2012; 2016; 2020; 2024

Other related appearances
- Rhodesia (1960)

Zambia competed at the 1968 Summer Olympics in Mexico City, Mexico. Previously, the nation had competed as Northern Rhodesia.

== Athletics ==
Men

Athlete	Event	Heat		Semi Final		Final	
Athlete	Event	Result	Rank	Result	Rank	Result	Rank
Godwin Kalimbwe	Marathon	—				2:45:26	40
Enoch Muemba	Marathon	—				3:06:16	56
Douglas Zinkala	Marathon	—				2:42:51	35

Key

- Note–Ranks given for track events are within the athlete's heat only
- Q = Qualified for the next round
- q = Qualified for the next round as a fastest loser or, in field events, by position without achieving the qualifying target
- NR = National record
- N/A = Round not applicable for the event
- Bye = Athlete not required to compete in round

== Boxing ==
Men

Athlete	Event	1 Round	2 Round	3 Round	Quarterfinals	Semifinals	Final
Athlete	Event	Opposition Result	Opposition Result	Opposition Result	Opposition Result	Opposition Result	Rank
David Nata	Light Flyweight	—	Tahar Aziz (MAR); L 1-4	did not advance			
Kenny Mwansa	Flyweight	—	Rodolfo Díaz (PHI); W 4-1	Nicolai Novikov (URS); L 1-4	did not advance		
Godfrey Mwamba	Bantamweight	Nikola Savov (BUL); L RSC	did not advance				
Julius Luipa	Welterweight	Rabah Labiod (ALG); W 4-1	BYE	Joseph Bessala (CMR); L RSC	did not advance		
