= Zane Jordan =

Zambian swimmer (born 1991)

Personal information
- Nationality: Zambia
- Born: 18 July 1991 (age 34) Mufulira, Zambia
- Height: 1.78 m (5 ft 10 in)

Sport
- Sport: Swimming

Zane Jordan (born 18 July 1991) is a Zambian Olympic swimmer. He swam for Zambia at the 2008 Olympics, finishing 65th in the 50 Freestyle and at the 2012 Summer Olympics, finishing 41st in the 100 backstroke.
