= Zambia at the 1972 Summer Olympics =

- IOC code: ZAM
- NOC: National Olympic Committee of Zambia

in Munich, West Germany 26 August–10 September 1972
- Competitors: 11 in 2 sports
- Officials: 7
- Medals: Gold 0 Silver 0 Bronze 0 Total 0

Summer Olympics appearances (overview)
- 1964; 1968; 1972; 1976; 1980; 1984; 1988; 1992; 1996; 2000; 2004; 2008; 2012; 2016; 2020; 2024

Other related appearances
- Rhodesia (1960)

Zambia competed at the 1972 Summer Olympics in Munich, West Germany.

== Athletics ==
Men
Track & road events

Athlete	Event	Heat		Quarterfinal		Semifinal		Final	
Athlete	Event	Result	Rank	Result	Rank	Result	Rank	Result	Rank
Larmeck Mukonde	100 m	11.16	6	did not advance					
Larmeck Mukonde	200 m	DNS		did not advance					
Nicodemus Maipampe	400 m	48.84	7	did not advance					
Benson Mulomba	800 m	1:53.4		did not advance					
Benson Mulomba	1500 m	DNS		did not advance					
Ngwila Musonda	5000 m	13:37.4	54	did not advance					

Women
Track & road events

Athlete	Event	Heat		Quarterfinal		Semifinal		Final	
Athlete	Event	Result	Rank	Result	Rank	Result	Rank	Result	Rank
Beatrice Lungu	100 m	12.42	6	did not advance					
Beatrice Lungu	200 m	25.11	6	did not advance					
Grace Muneene	400 m	57.71	7	did not advance					

Field events

Athlete	Event	Qualification		Final	
Athlete	Event	Distance	Position	Distance	Position
Audrey Chikani	Long jump	5.17	31	did not advance	

== Boxing ==
Men

Athlete	Event	1 Round	2 Round	3 Round	Quarterfinals	Semifinals	Final	
Athlete	Event	Opposition Result	Opposition Result	Opposition Result	Opposition Result	Opposition Result	Opposition Result	Rank
Timothy Feruka	Light Flyweight	Chanyalew Haile (ETH); L KO-1	did not advance					
Morgan Mwenya	Featherweight	Pasqualino Morbidelli (ITA); L 0-5	did not advance					
Yotham Kunda	Light Welterweight	Sodnomyn Gombo (MGL); L 0-5	did not advance					
Julius Luipa	Middleweight	Bill Knight (GBR); L 2-3	did not advance					
