= Zambia at the 2000 Summer Olympics =

- IOC code: ZAM
- NOC: National Olympic Committee of Zambia
- Website: www.nocz.co.zm

in Sydney
- Competitors: 8 (6 men, 2 women) in 3 sports
- Flag bearer: Samuel Matete
- Medals: Gold 0 Silver 0 Bronze 0 Total 0

Summer Olympics appearances (overview)
- 1964; 1968; 1972; 1976; 1980; 1984; 1988; 1992; 1996; 2000; 2004; 2008; 2012; 2016; 2020; 2024

Other related appearances
- Rhodesia (1960)

Zambia was represented at the 2000 Summer Olympics in Sydney, New South Wales, Australia by the National Olympic Committee of Zambia.

In total, eight athletes including six men and two women represented Zambia in three different sports including athletics, boxing and swimming.

== Competitors ==
In total, eight athletes represented Zambia at the 2000 Summer Olympics in Sydney, New South Wales, Australia across three different sports.

Sport	Men	Women	Total
Athletics	3	1	4
Boxing	2	–	2
Swimming	1	1	2
Total	6	2	8

== Athletics ==
In total, four Zambian athletes participated in the athletics events – Lilian Bwalya in the women's 400 m, Chungu Chipako in the men's 1,500 m, Samuel Matete in the men's 400 m hurdles and Sam Mfula Mwape in the men's 5,000 m.

The heats for the women's 400 m took place on 22 September 2000. Bwalya finished seventh in her heat in a time of 54.77 seconds. She did not advance to the quarter-finals.

The heats for the men's 400 m hurdles took place on 24 September 2000. Matete finished first in his heat in a time of 48.98 seconds as he advanced to the semi-finals. The semi-finals took place on 25 September 2000. Matete finished third in his semi-final in a time of 48.98 seconds. He did not advance to the final.

The heats for the men's 1,500 m took place on 25 September 2000. Chipako finished 12th in his heat in a time of three minutes 49.79 seconds. He did not advance to the semi-finals.

The heats for the men's 5,000 m took place on 27 September 2000. Mwape finished 13th in his heat in a time of 13 minutes 41.72 seconds. He did not advance to the final.

Athlete	Event	Heat		Quarterfinal		Semifinal		Final	
Athlete	Event	Result	Rank	Result	Rank	Result	Rank	Result	Rank
Chungu Chipako	Men's 1,500 m	03:49.79	38	did not advance					
Samuel Matete	Men's 400 m hurdles	48.98	1 Q	48.98	10	did not advance			
Sam Mfula Mwape	Men's 5,000 m	13:41.72	24	did not advance					
Lilian Bwalya	Women's 400 m	54.77	46	did not advance					

== Boxing ==
In total, two Zambian athletes participated in the boxing events – Ellis Chibuye in the welterweight category and Kennedy Kanyanta in the flyweight category.

The first round of the welterweight category took place on 16 September 2000. Chibuye lost his first round match to Roberto Guerra of Cuba.

Kanyanta received a bye in the first round of the flyweight category which took place on 19 September 2000. The second round took place on 24 September 2000. Kanyanta lost his second round match to Bulat Zhumadilov of Kazakhstan.

Athlete	Event	1 Round	2 Round	Quarterfinals	Semifinals	Final		
Athlete	Event	Opposition Result	Opposition Result	Opposition Result	Opposition Result	Opposition Result	Opposition Result	Rank
Kennedy Kanyanta	Flyweight	Bye	Bulat Zhumadilov (KAZ); L 9-12	did not advance				
Ellis Chibuye	Welterweight	Roberto Guerra (CUB); L 4-18	did not advance					

== Swimming ==
In total, two Zambian athletes participated in the swimming events – Ellen Hight in the women's 100 m butterfly and Leonard Ngoma in the men's 200 m breaststroke.

The heats for the women's 100 m butterfly took place on 16 September 2000. Hight finished fifth in her heat in a time of one minute 9.34 seconds which was ultimately not fast enough to advance to the semi-finals.

The heats for the men's 200 m breaststroke took place on 19 September 2000. Ngoma finished third in his heat in a time of two minutes 32.9 seconds which was ultimately not fast enough to advance to the semi-finals.

Athlete	Event	Heat		Semifinal		Final	
Athlete	Event	Time	Rank	Time	Rank	Time	Rank
Leonard Ngoma	Men's 200 m breaststroke	02:32.90	47	did not advance			
Ellen Hight	Women's 100 m butterfly	01:09.34	47	did not advance			

== See also ==
- Zambia at the 2000 Summer Paralympics
