= Northern Rhodesia at the 1964 Summer Olympics =

- Flag of Northern Rhodesia
- IOC code: NRH
- NOC: National Olympic Committee of Northern Rhodesia

in Tokyo, Japan 10–24 October 1964
- Competitors: 12 in 5 sports
- Flag bearer: Trev Haynes
- Medals: Gold 0 Silver 0 Bronze 0 Total 0

Summer Olympics appearances (overview)
- 1964; 1968; 1972; 1976; 1980; 1984; 1988; 1992; 1996; 2000; 2004; 2008; 2012; 2016; 2020; 2024; 2028

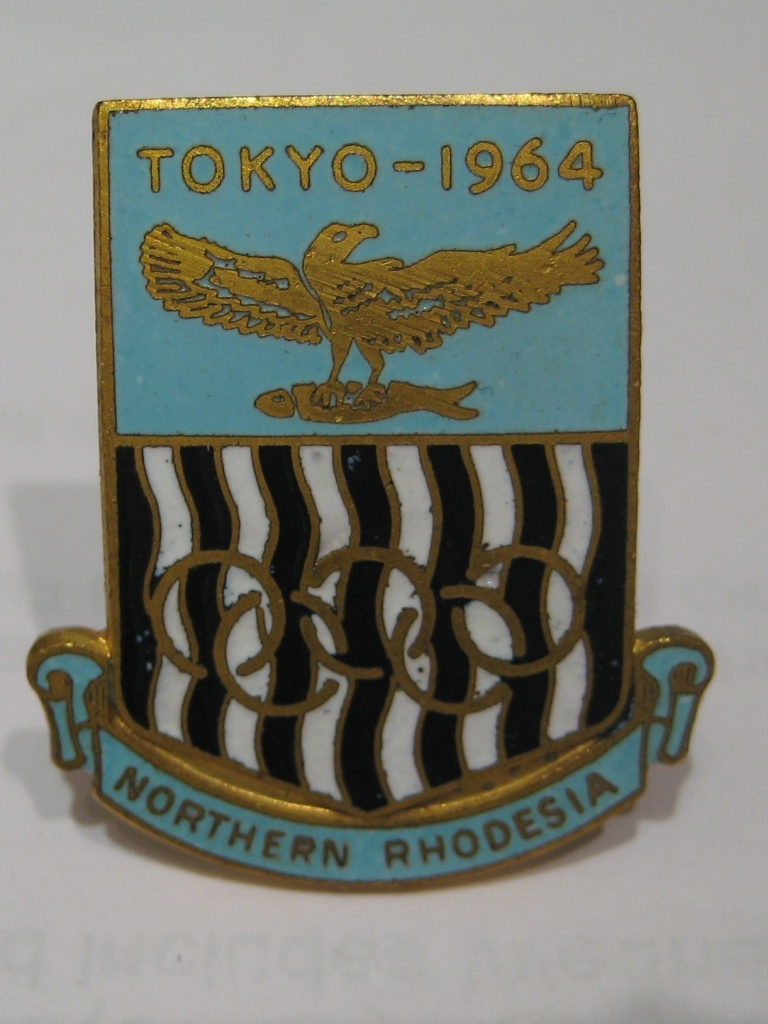
Northern Rhodesia Olympic Team badge

Northern Rhodesia (now Zambia) competed in the Summer Olympic Games for the first time at the 1964 Summer Olympics in Tokyo, Japan. 12 competitors, 11 men and 1 woman, took part in 13 events in 5 sports. These were the only Games for Northern Rhodesia. On 24 October 1964 (the same day as the closing ceremony), the country became independent from the UK and changed its name from Northern Rhodesia to Zambia, the first time a country entered an Olympic games as one country and left it as another. For that ceremony, the team celebrated by marching with a new placard with the word "Zambia" on it (as opposed to the "Northern Rhodesia" placard used in the opening ceremony). They were the only team to use a placard for the closing ceremony.

== Athletics ==
Men

Track & road events

Athlete	Event	Heat		Quarterfinal		Semifinal		Final	
Athlete	Event	Result	Rank	Result	Rank	Result	Rank	Result	Rank
Wallie Babb	110 m hurdles	14.7	7	Did not advance					
Laurent Chifita	Marathon	2:51:52.2	57	Did not advance					
Trev Haynes	Marathon	2:45:08.6	54	Did not advance					
Constantino Kapambwe	Marathon	2:39:28.4	46	Did not advance					
Jeffery Smith	100 m	10.8	7	Did not advance					
Jeffery Smith	200 m	21.7	4 Q	22.0	7	Did not advance			

== Boxing ==
Men

Athlete	Event	1 Round	2 Round	3 Round	Quarterfinals	Semifinals	Final
Athlete	Event	Opposition Result	Opposition Result	Opposition Result	Opposition Result	Opposition Result	Rank
Cornelis van der Walt	Bantamweight	—N/a	Nicolae Puiu (ROU); L RSC-1	Did not advance			
Ian McLoughlin	Featherweight	—N/a	Masataka Takayama (JPN); L 0-5	Did not advance			

== Fencing ==
One female fencer represented Northern Rhodesia in 1964.

Women's foil

- Patricia Skinner

== Swimming ==
Men

Athlete	Event	Heat		Semifinal		Final	
Athlete	Event	Time	Rank	Time	Rank	Time	Rank
Alan Durrett	400 metre freestyle	4:39.0	5	Did not advance			
Alan Durrett	1500 metre freestyle	18:24.9	5	Did not advance			
Charles Fox	200 metre breaststroke	2:49.1	8	Did not advance			
Charles Fox	400 metre medley	5:38.2	7	Did not advance			

== Wrestling ==
Men's Freestyle

Athlete	Event	Elimination Pool						Final round	
Athlete	Event	Round 1 Result	Round 2 Result	Round 3 Result	Round 4 Result	Round 5 Result	Round 6 Result	Final round Result	Rank
John Alan Smith	−63 kg	BYE	Osamu Watanabe (JPN); L T 1:26	Did not advance					19
Theunis van Wyk	−87 kg	Daniel Brand (USA); L T 6:07	Géza Hollosi (HUN); L T 4:40	Did not advance					16
