= Alan Durrett =

Zambian swimmer

Personal information
- Full name: Alan Hugh Durrett
- Born: 13 January 1948 (age 78)
- Height: 180 cm (5 ft 11 in)
- Weight: 78 kg (172 lb)

Sport
- Sport: Swimming

Alan Hugh Durrett (born 13 January 1948) is a former freestyle swimmer. He competed in two events at the 1964 Summer Olympics representing Northern Rhodesia.
