= Muzala Samukonga =

Zambian sprinter (born 2002)

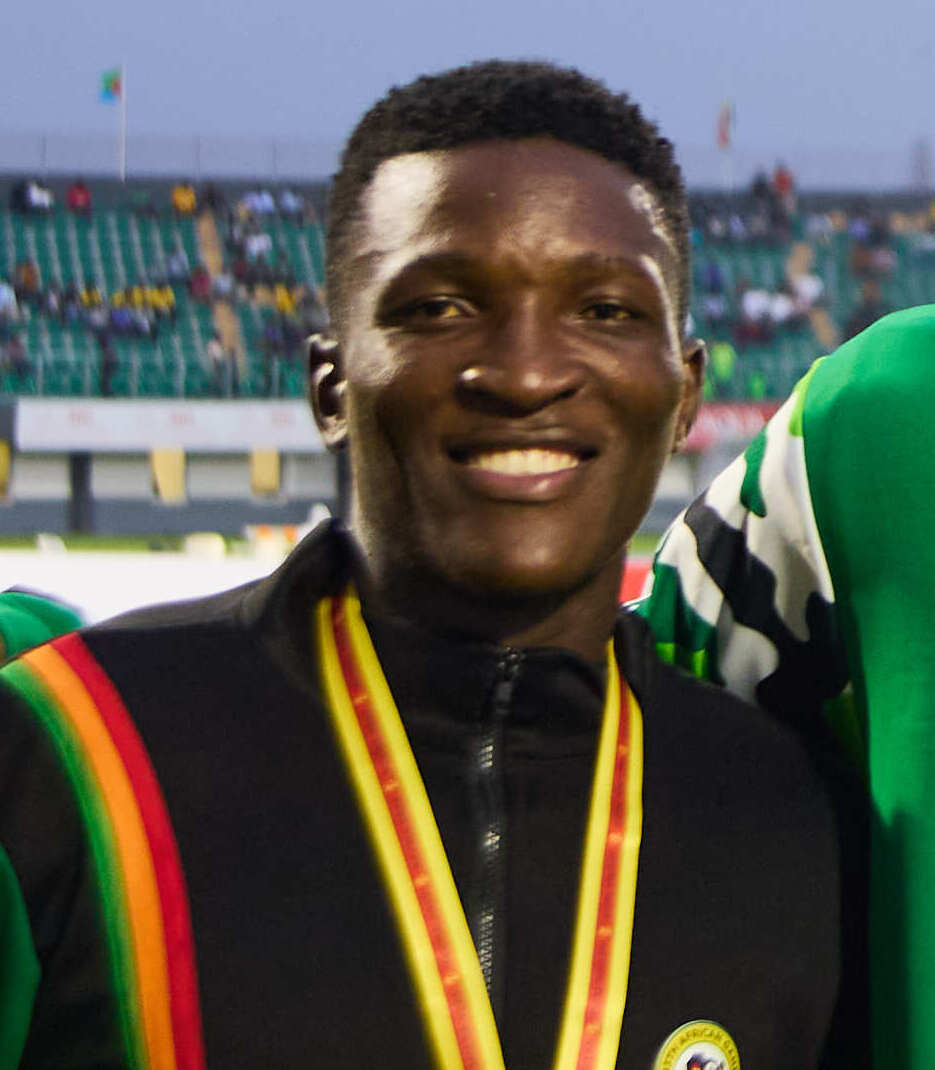
- Samukonga at the 2023 African Games

Personal information
- Nationality: Zambian
- Born: 9 December 2002 (age 23) Lusaka, Zambia

Sport
- Country: Zambia
- Sport: Track and field
- Event: Sprints

Achievements and titles
- Personal bests: 200 m: 20.23 (Miramar, 2025); 400 m: 43.74 NR (Paris, 2024)
Medal record
Men's athletics
Representing Zambia
Olympic Games
Bronze medal – third place	2024 Paris	400 m
Commonwealth Games
Gold medal – first place	2022 Birmingham	400 m
African Games
Gold medal – first place	2023 Accra	4×400 m relay
Silver medal – second place	2023 Accra	400 m
African Championships
Gold medal – first place	2022 Saint Pierre	400 m
Silver medal – second place	2022 Saint Pierre	4×400 m relay
Bronze medal – third place	2024 Douala	4×400 m relay

Muzala Samukonga (born 9 December 2002) is a Zambian track and field sprinter who specialises in the 400 metres. In 2022, at the age of 19, he won gold medals at the Birmingham Commonwealth Games and African Championships. A flagbearer for Zambia at the 2024 Summer Olympics, Samukonga won the bronze medal in the 400 metres event.

== Biography ==
Samukonga competed in the 400 metres at the 2021 World Under-20 Championships in Kenya, where he finished in fifth place after with a time of 45.89 s.

In March 2022, he recorded a new personal best in the event of 45.65 s in Botswana. On 10 June, Samukonga won the gold medal in the 400 m at the 2022 African Championships in Mauritius, upsetting Bayapo Ndori in the final with a time of 45.31 s. His victory ended a ten-year reign of athletes from Botswana in the event, namely Isaac Makwala and Baboloki Thebe. It also qualified him for the 2022 World Athletics Championships the following month in Eugene, Oregon.

In September 2024, it was announced that he had signed up for the inaugural season of the Michael Johnson founded Grand Slam Track.

On 23 May 2026, Samukonga had a second place finish in 44.04 seconds at the 2026 Xiamen Diamond League. On 14 July, he won the 400 m at the István Gyulai Memorial, in Budapest, in 44.02 seconds. In July, he placed sixth in the final of the 400 metres at the 2026 Commonwealth Games in Glasgow, Scotland.

== Achievements ==
All information taken from World Athletics profile.

=== Personal bests ===
Event	Time (m:)s	Wind (m/s)	Place	Date	Notes
200 metres	20.23	+1.7	Miramar, United States	2 May 2025	
400 metres	43.74	—N/a	Paris, France	7 August 2024	NR
4 × 400 m relay	3:04.76	—N/a	Birmingham, United Kingdom	7 August 2022	NR

=== Circuit performances ===
Grand Slam Track results
Slam	Race group	Event	Pl.	Time	Prize money
2025 Kingston Slam	Long sprints	400 m	5th	45.27	US$12,500
2025 Kingston Slam	Long sprints	200 m	7th	21.24	US$12,500
2025 Miami Slam	Long sprints	200 m	3rd	20.23	US$25,000
2025 Miami Slam	Long sprints	400 m	4th	44.56	US$25,000
2025 Philadelphia Slam	Long sprints	400 m	4th	45.10	US$20,000
2025 Philadelphia Slam	Long sprints	200 m	4th	20.56	US$20,000

=== International championships results ===
Representing Zambia
Year	Competition	Venue	Position	Event	Time
2021	World U20 Championships	Nairobi, Kenya	5th	400 m	45.89 PB
2022	African Championships	Saint Pierre, Mauritius	1st	400 m	45.31
2022	African Championships	Saint Pierre, Mauritius	2nd	4 × 400 m relay	3:05.53
2022	World Championships	Eugene, OR, United States	9th (sf)	400 m	45.02 PB
2022	Commonwealth Games	Birmingham, United Kingdom	1st	400 m	44.66 NR
2022	Commonwealth Games	Birmingham, United Kingdom	5th	4 × 400 m relay	3:04.76 NR
2024	African Games	Accra, Ghana	2nd	400 m	45.37
2024	African Games	Accra, Ghana	1st	4 × 400 m relay	2:59.12
2024	African Championships	Douala, Cameroon	3rd	4 × 400 m relay	3:02.56
2024	Olympic Games	Paris, France	3rd	400 m	43.74
2024	Olympic Games	Paris, France	8th	4 × 400 m relay	3:02.76
2025	World Championships	Tokyo, Japan	9th (sf)	400 m	44.60
2025	World Championships	Tokyo, Japan	–	4 × 400 m relay	DQ
2026	Commonwealth Games	Glasgow, United Kingdom	6th	400 m	45.61
2026	World Ultimate Championship	Budapest, Hungary	14th (h)	400 m	45.51

In addition, as of August 2024, Samukonga holds the track record for Gaborone where he clocked 43.91 seconds in April 2023.

Olympic Games
Preceded by Everisto Mulenga; Tilka Paljk	Flag bearer for Zambia; Paris 2024 with Margaret Tembo	Succeeded by Incumbent
