= Trevor Haynes =

Zambian athlete (1929–2025)

Personal information
- Nationality: Northern Rhodesian
- Born: 17 November 1929 Broken Hill, Northern Rhodesia
- Died: 1 August 2025 (aged 95)

Sport
- Sport: Long-distance running
- Event: Marathon

Trevor Sackville Anthony Haynes (17 November 1929 – 1 August 2025) was a Northern Rhodesian and Zambian long-distance runner. He competed in the marathon at the 1964 Summer Olympics representing Northern Rhodesia. He carried the Northern Rhodesian flag at the Tokyo Olympics Opening Ceremony, but as Zambia declared its independence on 24 October 1964, Haynes carried the Zambian flag at the Closing Ceremony. Haynes died on 1 August 2025, at the age of 95.
