= Athletics at the 2024 Summer Olympics – Men's 400 metres =

Men's 400 metres at the Games of the XXXIII Olympiad
- Venue: Stade de France, Paris, France
- Dates: 4 August 2024 (heats); 5 August 2024 (repechage round); 6 August 2024 (semi-finals); 7 August 2024 (final)
- Winning time: 43.40

Medalists
1st place, gold medalist(s)		Quincy Hall	United States
2nd place, silver medalist(s)		Matthew Hudson-Smith	Great Britain
3rd place, bronze medalist(s)		Muzala Samukonga	Zambia

The men's 400 metres at the 2024 Summer Olympics was held in four rounds at the Stade de France in Paris, France, between 4-7 August 2024. This was the 30th time that the men's 400 metres was contested at the Summer Olympics. A total of 48 athletes were able to qualify for the event by entry standard or ranking.

The 2024 men's final was the fastest 400-meter race in Olympic history, collectively: five of the eight men ran under 43.87 seconds, with these five times ranking among the top 15 fastest Olympic times.

The winning margin was 0.04 seconds which is the narrowest winning margin in the men's 400 metres at the Olympics since the introduction of fully automatic timing.

Steven Gardiner was a reigning champion in Tokyo 2021, but he did not start in the fourth heat.

== Summary ==
The entire podium from Tokyo returned, Steven Gardiner, Anthony Zambrano and Kirani James. 31-year old veteran James was the 2012 Olympic champion and had a complete set of medals. Also returning was Tokyo 5th place and 2022 World Athletics champion Michael Norman. Reigning World Athletics champion Antonio Watson did not compete due to injury. The world leader for the season was 2022 World Athletics Championship bronze medalist Matthew Hudson-Smith.

World record holder Wayde van Niekerk did not compete, instead electing to run 200 metres. Owing to injury, Tokyo gold medalist Gardiner did not start in heat 4. Silver medalist Zambrano failed to qualify in heat 2, finishing seventh. Bronze medalist James qualified for his fourth Olympic 400m final in a row with a 43.78 win in Semifinal 2, the fastest semi-final time ever at the Olympics . Also qualified were Zambian Muzala Samukonga and American Christopher Bailey. 2023 World Championship bronze medalist Quincy Hall edged out fellow qualifier Trinidadian Jereem Richards with a 43.95 time to win Semifinal 1. Future 2025 World Champion Busang Kebinatshipi came third, failing to go through to the final. In Semifinal 3, Samuel Ogazi, Norman, and Hudson-Smith all progressed.

As the final began, Richards quickly accelerated to take the lead, splitting 20.46 at the 200m mark. Hall, James, Hudson-Smith, and Samukonga formed a chasing pack, gradually catching up to Richards near the end of the turn. Coming off the turn, Hudson-Smith assumed the lead barely ahead of Richards and James, with Hall and Samukonga trailing. Further behind were Norman, Bailey, and Ogazi, whom were out of contention by this point. Hall, visibly struggling and grimacing, had edged ahead of Samukonga and began bearing down on the three leaders. Down the final stretch, with the front three in stagnant positions, Hall surged forward, followed by Samukonga. With extraordinary effort, Hall passed James and Richards in quick succession, and caught up to Hudson-Smith at the front. James and Richards both fell behind, later to be surpassed by Samukonga as he attempted match Hall's move. Hudson-Smith was unable to hold off Hall, settling with silver as the American snatched gold in an exceptional comeback. Samukonga poached bronze from fourth place Richards, while James was demoted to fifth. Bailey and Ogazi finished sixth and seventh, respectively. Norman finished last and ran a time of 45.62, slower than his marks in the semi-final and qualifying heat.

Hall ran the fourth-fastest time in the event's history, while Hudson-Smith ran the fifth-fastest, the fastest non-winning time recorded and a new European record. Samukonga and Richards also both achieved national records. The first four finishers (Hall, Hudson-Smith, Samukonga, and Richards), achieved personal bests.

== Background ==
The men's 400 metres has been present on the Olympic athletics programme since the inaugural edition in 1896. The reigning Olympic champion is Steven Gardiner from the Bahamas.

Global records before the 2024 Summer Olympics
Record	Athlete (nation)	Time (s)	Location	Date
World record	Wayde van Niekerk (RSA)	43.03	Rio de Janeiro, Brazil	14 August 2016
Olympic record	Wayde van Niekerk (RSA)	43.03	Rio de Janeiro, Brazil	14 August 2016
World leading	Matthew Hudson-Smith (GBR)	43.74	London, United Kingdom	20 July 2024

Area records before the 2024 Summer Olympics
Area record	Athlete (nation)	Time (s)
Africa (records)	Wayde van Niekerk (RSA)	43.03 WR
Asia (records)	Yousef Masrahi (KSA)	43.93
Europe (records)	Matthew Hudson-Smith (GBR)	43.74
North, Central America and Caribbean (records)	Michael Johnson (USA)	43.18
Oceania (records)	Darren Clark (AUS)	44.38
South America (records)	Anthony Zambrano (COL)	43.93

== Qualification ==
For the men's 400 metres event, the qualification period is between 1 July 2023 and 30 June 2024. 48 athletes are able to qualify for the event, with a maximum of three athletes per nation, by running the entry standard of 45.00 seconds or faster or by their World Athletics Ranking for this event.

== Results ==
=== Heats ===
The heats were held on 4 August, starting at 19:05 (UTC+2) in the evening.
Qualification rule: First 3 in each heat (Q) advance to semi-finals, all others advance to Repechage round (except DNS, DNF, DQ).

==== Heat 1 ====
Rank	Lane	Athlete	Nation	Time	Notes
1	6	Matthew Hudson-Smith	Great Britain	44.78	Q
2	3	Christopher Bailey	United States	44.89	Q
3	4	Håvard Bentdal Ingvaldsen	Norway	45.46	Q
4	7	Chidi Okezie	Nigeria	45.52	
5	2	Kentaro Sato	Japan	45.60	
6	8	Oleksandr Pohorilko	Ukraine	45.71	
7	5	Deandre Watkin	Jamaica	45.97	

==== Heat 2 ====
Rank	Lane	Athlete	Nation	Time	Notes
1	6	Michael Norman	United States	44.10	Q, SB
2	9	Jereem Richards	Trinidad and Tobago	44.31	Q
3	2	Busang Kebinatshipi	Botswana	44.45	Q, PB
4	8	Ammar Ibrahim	Qatar	44.66	PB
5	5	Sean Bailey	Jamaica	44.68	
6	4	Attila Molnár	Hungary	45.24	
7	7	Anthony Zambrano	Colombia	45.49	
8	3	Michael Joseph	Saint Lucia	45.69	

==== Heat 3 ====
Rank	Lane	Athlete	Nation	Time	Notes
1	3	Muzala Samukonga	Zambia	44.56	Q
2	2	Bayapo Ndori	Botswana	44.87	Q
3	8	Luca Sito	Italy	44.99	Q
4	5	Jean Paul Bredau	Germany	45.07	
5	7	Dylan Borlée	Belgium	45.36	
6	9	Yuki Joseph Nakajima	Japan	45.37	
7	6	Lythe Pillay	South Africa	45.60	
8	4	Matěj Krsek	Czech Republic	45.71	

==== Heat 4 ====
Rank	Lane	Athlete	Nation	Time	Notes
1	7	Quincy Hall	United States	44.28	Q
2	5	Samuel Ogazi	Nigeria	44.50	Q, PB
3	6	Reece Holder	Australia	44.53	Q, PB
4	8	Jonathan Sacoor	Belgium	45.08	
5	2	Alexander Ogando	Dominican Republic	45.11	SB
6	3	Elián Larregina	Argentina	47.80	
	4	Steven Gardiner	Bahamas	DNS	

==== Heat 5 ====
Rank	Lane	Athlete	Nation	Time	Notes
1	6	Kirani James	Grenada	44.78	Q
2	8	Christopher Morales Williams	Canada	44.96	Q
3	9	Aruna Darshana	Sri Lanka	44.99	Q, PB
4	4	Zakithi Nene	South Africa	45.01	
5	7	Leungo Scotch	Botswana	45.28	
6	3	Lionel Spitz	Switzerland	45.81	
7	5	Lucas Carvalho	Brazil	45.85	
8	2	Davide Re	Italy	46.74	

==== Heat 6 ====
Rank	Lane	Athlete	Nation	Time	Notes
1	5	Charlie Dobson	Great Britain	44.96	Q
2	7	Alexander Doom	Belgium	45.01	Q
3	3	Jevaughn Powell	Jamaica	45.12	Q
4	9	João Coelho	Portugal	45.35	SB
5	2	Cheikh Tidiane Diouf	Senegal	45.59	
6	8	Fuga Sato	Japan	46.13	
7	4	Gilles Biron	France	46.19	
	6	Zablon Ekwam	Kenya	DNF	

=== Repechage round ===
The repechage round was held on 5 August, starting at 11:20 (UTC+2) in the morning.
Qualification rule: First in each Repechage heat (Q) and next 2 fastest (q) advance to semi-finals.

==== Heat 1 ====
Rank	Lane	Athlete	Nation	Time	Notes
1	4	Elián Larregina	Argentina	45.36	Q
2	8	Gilles Biron	France	45.87	
3	3	Lucas Carvalho	Brazil	46.24	
	7	Davide Re	Italy	DNS	
	2	Jonathan Sacoor	Belgium	DNS	
	6	Fuga Sato	Japan	DNS	
	5	Deandre Watkin	Jamaica	DNS	

==== Heat 2 ====
Rank	Lane	Athlete	Nation	Time	Notes
1	5	Lythe Pillay	South Africa	45.40	Q
2	7	Matěj Krsek	Czech Republic	45.53	PB
3	3	Oleksandr Pohorilko	Ukraine	45.59	
4	6	Michael Joseph	Saint Lucia	45.64	
5	4	Chidi Okezie	Nigeria	45.92	
	2	Yuki Joseph Nakajima	Japan	DNS	
	8	Alexander Ogando	Dominican Republic	DNS	

==== Heat 3 ====
Rank	Lane	Athlete	Nation	Time	Notes
1	4	Zakithi Nene	South Africa	44.81	Q
2	6	Leungo Scotch	Botswana	45.33	q
3	3	Attila Molnár	Hungary	45.45	
4	5	Lionel Spitz	Switzerland	45.51	
	8	Kentaro Sato	Japan	DNS	
	7	Anthony Zambrano	Colombia	DNS	

==== Heat 4 ====
Rank	Lane	Athlete	Nation	Time	Notes
1	3	Ammar Ibrahim	Qatar	44.77	Q
2	8	Cheikh Tidiane Diouf	Senegal	45.03	q, =PB
3	6	Jean Paul Bredau	Germany	45.40	
4	7	Dylan Borlée	Belgium	45.51	
5	4	João Coelho	Portugal	45.64	
	5	Sean Bailey	Jamaica	DNF	

=== Semi-finals ===
The semi-finals were held on 6 August, starting at 19:35 (UTC+2) in the evening.
Qualification rule: First 2 in each heat (Q) and next 2 fastest (q) advance to final.

==== Semifinal 1 ====
Rank	Lane	Athlete	Nation	Time	Notes
1	5	Quincy Hall	United States	43.95	Q
2	7	Jereem Richards	Trinidad and Tobago	44.33	Q
3	4	Busang Kebinatshipi	Botswana	44.43	
4	8	Charlie Dobson	Great Britain	44.48	PB
5	3	Ammar Ibrahim	Qatar	44.63	PB
6	2	Cheikh Tidiane Diouf	Senegal	44.94	NR
7	9	Håvard Bentdal Ingvaldsen	Norway	45.60	
8	6	Alexander Doom	Belgium	1:55.10	

==== Semifinal 2 ====
Rank	Lane	Athlete	Nation	Time	Notes
1	8	Kirani James	Grenada	43.78	Q, SB
2	5	Muzala Samukonga	Zambia	43.81	Q, NR
3	6	Christopher Bailey	United States	44.31	q, PB
4	7	Bayapo Ndori	Botswana	44.43	
5	9	Luca Sito	Italy	45.01	
6	2	Elián Larregina	Argentina	45.02	
7	3	Lythe Pillay	South Africa	45.24	
	4	Aruna Darshana	Sri Lanka	DQ	TR17.2.3

==== Semifinal 3 ====
Rank	Lane	Athlete	Nation	Time	Notes
1	7	Matthew Hudson-Smith	Great Britain	44.07	Q
2	6	Michael Norman	United States	44.26	Q
3	5	Samuel Ogazi	Nigeria	44.41	q, PB
4	9	Jevaughn Powell	Jamaica	44.91	
5	4	Reece Holder	Australia	44.94	
6	3	Zakithi Nene	South Africa	45.06	
7	2	Leungo Scotch	Botswana	45.16	
8	8	Christopher Morales Williams	Canada	45.25	

=== Final ===
The final was held on 7 August, starting at 21:20 (UTC+2) in the evening.

Rank	Lane	Athlete	Nation	Time	Notes
1st place, gold medalist(s)	8	Quincy Hall	United States	43.40	PB, WL
2nd place, silver medalist(s)	6	Matthew Hudson-Smith	Great Britain	43.44	AR, NR
3rd place, bronze medalist(s)	7	Muzala Samukonga	Zambia	43.74	NR
4	9	Jereem Richards	Trinidad and Tobago	43.78	NR
5	5	Kirani James	Grenada	43.87	
6	2	Christopher Bailey	United States	44.58	
7	3	Samuel Ogazi	Nigeria	44.73	
8	4	Michael Norman	United States	45.62	
