= Everisto Mulenga =

Zambian boxer (born 1999)

Personal information
- Nationality: Zambian
- Born: 26 March 1999 (age 27)
- Height: 1.67 m (5 ft 6 in)
- Weight: Bantamweight; Featherweight

Boxing career
Medal record
Men's amateur boxing
Representing Zambia
African Games
Bronze medal – third place	2019 Rabat	Featherweight

Everisto Mulenga (born 26 March 1999) is a Zambian amateur boxer. He won a bronze medal at the 2019 African Games and later qualified for the 2020 Summer Olympics by winning the African Qualification Tournament, both at featherweight.

== Career ==
Mulenga won a silver medal at the 2016 African Region V Youth U20 Games in Luanda, losing to Ricardo Malajika of South Africa in the finals. He reached the quarterfinals of the bantamweight event at the 2018 Commonwealth Games, where he won his first bout before suffering a loss to Mohammad Hussamuddin. Mulenga won a featherweight bronze medal at the 2019 African Games in Rabat. He won three straight fights before losing to the eventual gold medalist Mohamed Hamout in the semifinals.

Mulenga qualified for the 2020 Summer Olympics with a first-place finish at the African Qualification Tournament, where he defeated veteran Nick Okoth in the final via unanimous decision. At the Tokyo Olympics, he received a first-round bye in the featherweight bracket. Mulenga began his first bout against Ceiber Ávila by opening a cut above his opponent's eye in the first round, but he ultimately lost the fight by split decision.

Olympic Games
Preceded by Mathews Punza	Flag bearer for Zambia; Tokyo 2020 with Tilka Paljk	Succeeded by Muzala Samukonga; Margaret Tembo
