= Fackson Nkandu =

Zambian long-distance runner (born 1971)

Fackson Nkandu (born 27 May 1971) is a Zambian long-distance runner who specialized in the 10,000 metres during his career.

He won a bronze medal in this event at the 1994 Commonwealth Games. He also competed in the 1993 World Championships. He is the national record order in the 10 km road, setting his mark in Durban, Republic of South Africa on 16 November 1996. Also a Zambian records in athletics in The 3rd IAAF World Half Marathon Championships was held on 24 September 1994 in Oslo, Norway.

== Achievements ==
Year	Competition	Venue	Position	Event	Notes
Representing Zambia
1994	Commonwealth Games	Victoria, British Columbia	3rd	10,000 m	28:51.72
World Half Marathon Championships	Oslo, Norway	8th	Half marathon	1:01:30 NR	
