= Mathews Punza =

Zambian judoka

Personal information
- Nationality: Zambian
- Born: 27 April 1988 (age 38)

Sport
- Sport: Judo

Mathews Punza (born 27 April 1988) is a Zambian judoka. He participated in the 2010 World Judo Championships and later championships.

Punza began studying judo at the age of six, attending classes at Lilayi Police College. As an adult, he became an officer in the police service.

In 2015, Punza and fellow Zambian judoka Boas Munyonga traveled to Uzbekistan to study judo, under a scholarship program from the International Judo Federation. Punza and Munyoga were unable to compete in the 2016 European Open Championship, as a result of visa difficulties with the government of the Czech Republic. In spite of this, Punza was able to qualify to compete in the Olympics by scoring enough points in competition to meet the continental qualification quota.

Punza competed at the 2016 Summer Olympics in Rio de Janeiro, where he was Zambia's flag bearer during the opening ceremony. In the men's 66 kg class, he defeated Golan Pollack of Israel in the second round, but lost to Adrian Gomboč of Slovenia in the third round.

Olympic Games
Preceded by Prince Mumba	Flag bearer for Zambia; Rio de Janeiro 2016	Succeeded by Tilka Paljk and Everisto Mulenga
