= Davison Lishebo =

Zambian sprinter

Personal information
- Nationality: Zambian
- Born: 2 January 1955
- Died: August 18, 2002 (aged 47)

Sport
- Sport: Sprinting
- Event: 400 metres

Davison Lishebo (2 January 1955 — 18 August 2002), also known as David Lishebo, was a Zambian sprinter and hurdler. He competed in the men's 400 metres hurdles and 4 × 400 metres relay at the 1980 Summer Olympics and the men's 400 metres at the 1984 Summer Olympics.

== Career ==
Lishebo set Zambian national records in the 60 metres hurdles in 1976 and 110 metres hurdles in 1979. At the 1980 Summer Olympics, Lishebo placed 7th in both his 400 metres and 4 × 400 metres heats and did not advance in both events.

Lishebo was one of four international Olympians to compete for the Mount St. Mary's Mountaineers track and field team in the 1980s. Their presence was cited as a reason that NCAA Division II track and field became more competitive. He won the 1984 NCAA Division II Men's Outdoor Track and Field Championships national title in the 400 metres. He also set multiple school records at Mount St. Mary's.

He trained at Emory University's campus before the 1984 Summer Olympics. At the 1984 Games, he was the Zambian flag bearer. He won his first-round heat and placed 4th in his quarter-final, running 45.57 seconds to advance to the semi-finals. In the second semi-final, he placed 8th in 45.97 seconds and did not make the finals.

He won the 1985 Martin Luther King Jr. International Freedom Games in the 400 m, beating Antonio McKay who did not finish the race.

At the 1989 Penn Relays, he ran on a distance medley relay alongside reigning Olympic 1500 metres champion Peter Rono.

== Personal life ==
Lishebo graduated from Mount St. Mary's University in 1988 and completed a Master of Business Administration in 1990. He died on 18 August 2002 from cerebral malaria.

In 2007, he was posthumously inducted into the Penn Relays Hall of Fame for his performance in the 1987 Penn distance medley relay race. Despite finishing 3rd, his team ran faster than the previous world record in the event, with Georgetown and Villanova also breaking the previous record in first and second.
