= Mutale Mulenga =

Zambian athlete

Personal information
- Nationality: Zambian
- Born: 29 September 1967 (age 58)

Sport
- Sport: Athletics
- Event: High jump

Mutale Mulenga (born 29 September 1967) is a Zambian high jumper who lived in England. In 1983, he set the world record for highest jump by a 16-year-old athlete. He competed in the men's high jump at the 1984 Summer Olympics.

== Career ==
In 1982, Mulenga jumped 1.90 m representing Dorset to set the championship record high jump performance at the English Schools' Athletics Championships.

The following year, Mulenga jumped 2.03 m to set the single-age world record for highest jump by a 16-year-old athlete. The mark was an 11 cm improvement on his personal best. He attempted but did not clear 2.05 m, which would have set the world record for any under-18 athlete.

In June 1984, Mulenga jumped 1.96 metres at the Southwest Counties Schools' Athletics Championships in England. He claimed a poor takeoff prevented him from jumping near his personal best, but nonetheless set the championship record.

Mulenga was scheduled to compete in the high jump at the 1986 Commonwealth Games, but he did not start the event. He was also selected to represent Dorset at the 1986 English Schools' Athletics Championships.

At the 1984 Olympics, Mulenga was seeded in the 'B' high jump qualification group. He was observed to be the only Olympian not using the Fosbury Flop, instead resorting to the straddle technique that was seen as outdated. This reportedly made the crowd cheer him as an underdog. After missing his first attempt, he cleared 2.05 m using the straddle method, though he missed all his attempts at 2.10 m and did not qualify for the finals.

At the 1986 track and field championships of Dorset, Malenga won the junior high jump with a 1.80 m mark but also won the junior 110 metres hurdles in a championship record time of 15.8 seconds.

== Personal life ==
Mulenga attended Bryanston School in Bryanston, Dorset, England. He was 1.78 metres (5 ft 10 in) tall and could jump 23 centimetres (9.1 in) above his height in 1983.
