= Charles Mulinga =

Zambian long-distance runner

Personal information
- Nationality: Zambian
- Born: 5 April 1963 (age 63)

Sport
- Sport: Long-distance running
- Event: 10,000 metres

Charles Mulinga (born 5 April 1963) is a Zambian long-distance runner. He competed in the men's 10,000 metres at the 1996 Summer Olympics.
