= Suwilanji Mpondela =

Zambian athlete

Suwilanji Theresa Fotwe Mpondela
Personal information
- Full name: Suwilanji Theresa Fotwe Mpondela Daka
- Nationality: Zambian
- Born: Suwilanji Theresa Fotwe Mpondela; 7 February 2000 (age 26) Lusaka, Zambia

Sport
- Country: Zambia
- Sport: Track and field
- Event: 100 metres 4 × 100 metres relay

Suwilanji Theresa Fotwe Mpondela-Daka (born 7 February 2000) is a Zambian athlete who specializes in sprinting. Since 2019, She has been serving the Athletes Commission for the National Olympic Committee of Zambia (NOCZ). She is married to Zambian footballer Patson Daka.

== Early life and education ==
Mpondela was born in the Lusaka the capital of Zambia on 7 February 2000. She is the last of five children to Elias Ng’andu Mpondela, the president of Zambia Amateur Athletic Association (ZAAA) from 1999 to date, and Judith Nankamba. In 2017, she was awarded a four-year scholarship through the International Olympic Committee (IOC) programme.

== Athletics career ==
In 2015, Mpondela started training at Olympic Youth Development Centre (OYDC) with focus on training more and reaching her targets for her career, this saw her qualifying for the 100 metres race for the 2015 African Youth Athletics Championships in Mauritius which was her first major competition. She finished first in her qualifying race to move into the semi-finals of which she emerged third to get into the finals. Unfortunately she finished outside the medal brackets placing sixth however she managed to reduce her personal best time of 13:08 seconds and set a new best of 12:81.

Mpondela gained another international experience in 2017 when she reached the semi-finals in the 100-meter run at the U18 World Championships in Nairobi, where she was eliminated with 12.33 seconds. She then on to compete at the Commonwealth Youth Games in Nassau with where she went through to the semifinals and was eliminated after pulling a 12.59 s in the semifinals. The following year she was selected as part of the Zambian women's 4 × 100 metres relay for the 2018 African Championships in Athletics.

That same year in July, she went for the U20 World Championships in Tampere, but did not go past the heats after running a 12.38 s race in heat 4 and in 2019 she was fifth at the Junior African Championships in Abidjan in 12.19 s. Thereafter in 2019 she took part in the Africa Games in Rabat losing out with 12.78 s in the preliminary round. In April 2021, she along with her colleagues set a new national record in Lusaka with the Zambian 4 x 100 meter relay with 43.85 s. However they missed the finals at the World Athletics Relays in Chorzów, Poland after running a 44.81 s in the preliminary round in May 2021.

== Personal life ==
In March 2019, during the launch of the Athletes Commission for the National Olympic Committee of Zambia (NOCZ) at Olympic Youth Development Centre in Lusaka, she was voted in as the inaugural chairperson at the age of 19, making her Africa's youngest elected Athletes Commission Chair. In July 2021, she joined the Equitysport Advisory Council whilst doubling also as an ambassador for the international equality-in-sport charity to help raise the profile and advocacy work of the organisation.

Her role model is Shelly-Ann Fraser-Pryce. In July 2022, Suwilanji reportedly married association football player Patson Daka at the Lusaka’s Civic Centre.

In November 2022, the couple held their marriage ceremony and celebration with family and friends in Dubai, UAE.

== Statistics ==
=== Personal best ===
Information from World Athletics profile unless otherwise noted.

- 100 Meter: 11,79 s (+0,7 m/s), 15. May 2021 in Lusaka
- 200 Meter: 25,52 s (0,0 m/s), 20. June 2018 in Grefrath-Oedt
