= Jordan Chipangama =

Zambian athlete

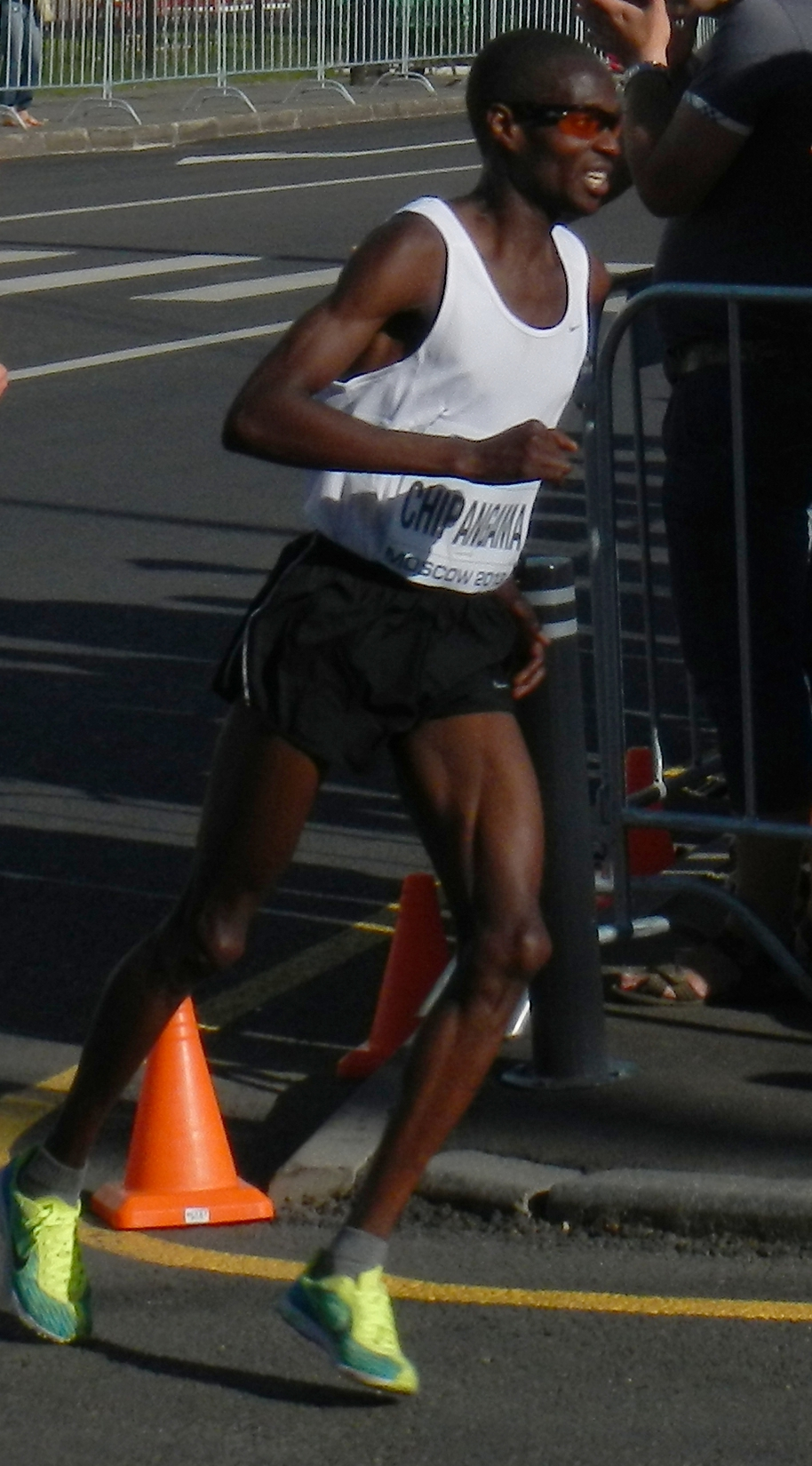
- Chipangama at the 2013 World Championships

Personal information
- Born: 12 November 1988 (age 37) Mudukula village, Choma, Zambia

Sport
- Country: Zambia
- Sport: Track and field
- Event: Marathon

Jordan Chipangama (born 12 November 1988) is a retired Zambian long-distance runner who specialised in the marathon. He competed in the men's marathon event at the 2016 Summer Olympics where he finished in 93rd place with a time of 2:24:58. Chipangama attended college in the United States. In college, he competed for Central Arizona College and Northern Arizona University.

Chipangama served a four-year ban from 2017 to 2021 for anti-doping rule violation after testing positive for meldonium.
