= Prince Mumba (athlete) =

Zambian middle-distance runner

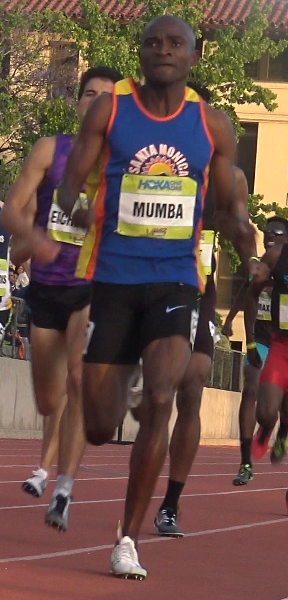

Personal information
- Nationality: Zambian
- Born: 28 September 1984 (age 41) Kitwe, Zambia
- Height: 1.80 m (5 ft 11 in)
- Weight: 67 kg (148 lb)

Sport
- Country: Zambia
- Sport: Track and field
- Event: 800 meters
- College team: Oral Roberts University
- Club: Santa Monica Track Club
- Coached by: Joe Douglas

Achievements and titles
- Personal bests: 400 meters: 47.94; 800 meters: 1:46.14; 1500 meters: 3:46.44; Mile: 4:08.67
- Updated on 29 November 2014

Prince Moses Mumba (born 28 September 1984) is a Zambian former track and field athlete who specialized in the 800 meters. He competed for Zambia at the 2004 and the 2012 Summer Olympics. Mumba participated in three IAAF World Championships in Athletics, in 2005, 2009, and 2011. Additionally, he also represented Zambia in two All Africa Games in 2007 and 2011. He works as the track and field and cross country coach at Brentwood School in Brentwood, California. Mumba was the flagbearer for Zambia at the 2012 Summer Olympics opening and closing ceremonies.

== Life ==
He was born in Kitwe, Zambia. By the age of 18, Mumba had competed in the 2002 Commonwealth Games and in the 2002 World Junior Championships in Athletics. He then was recruited by Oral Roberts University, where he was a track standout. Mumba is a member of the Oral Roberts University Hall of Fame. After college, he took up athletics professionally with Santa Monica Track Club.

In 2016 he was featured in a commercial called "HOPE" for Footlocker's "Real Lives x Real Runners" campaign, and a movie is currently being developed on his life. The feature film will be directed by Ashley Avis, and produced by Cary Granat, Michael Flaherty, and Edward Winters.

== Competition record ==
Year	Competition	Venue	Position	Event	Notes
Representing Zambia
2001	World Championships	Edmonton, Canada	30th (h)	800 m	1:49.49
2002	World Junior Championships	Kingston, Jamaica	13th (sf)	800 m	1:50.96
2002	Commonwealth Games	Manchester, United Kingdom	13th (sf)	800 m	1:48.51
2003	All-Africa Games	Abuja, Nigeria	13th (h)	800 m	1:51.57
2004	Olympic Games	Athens, Greece	55th (h)	800 m	1:48.36
2005	World Championships	Helsinki, Finland	33rd (h)	800 m	1:49.10
2007	All-Africa Games	Algiers, Algeria	16th (h)	800 m	1:50.37
2009	World Championships	Berlin, Germany	29th (h)	800 m	1:48.13
2011	World Championships	Daegu, South Korea	20th (sf)	800 m	1:47.06
2011	All-Africa Games	Maputo, Mozambique	4th	800 m	1:47.04
2012	Olympic Games	London, United Kingdom	42nd (h)	800 m	1:49.07
2013	World Championships	Moscow, Russia	29th (h)	800 m	1:47.85
2014	Commonwealth Games	Glasgow, United Kingdom	8th (h)	4 × 400 m relay	3:07.43
2014	African Championships	Marrakesh, Morocco	16th (h)	800 m	1:51.02

Olympic Games
Preceded by Hastings Bwalya	Flag bearer for Zambia; London 2012	Succeeded by Mathews Punza
