= Davis Mwale =

Zambian boxer (born 1972)

Medal record

Representing Zambia

Men's Boxing

Commonwealth Games
Bronze medal – third place	1998 Kuala Lumpur	Light Welterweight
Bronze medal – third place	2002 Manchester	Light Welterweight

All-Africa Games
Bronze medal – third place	2003 Abuja	Light Welterweight

Davis Mwale (born May 8, 1972) is a boxer from Zambia.

He participated in the 2004 Summer Olympics for his native African country. There he was stopped in the second round of the Light welterweight (64 kg) division by Cuba's eventual runner-up Yudel Johnson Cedeno.

Mwale won the bronze medal in the same division one year earlier, at the All-Africa Games in Abuja, Nigeria.
