= Gerald Phiri =

Zambian sprinter (born 1988)

Gerald Phiri OLY
Personal information
- Born: 6 October 1988 (age 37) Zambia
- Height: 1.78 m (5 ft 10 in)
- Weight: 79 kg (174 lb)

Sport
- Country: Zambia
- Sport: Athletics
- Event: 100 metres

Achievements and titles
- Personal best: 100m 10.03 (2014) 200m 20.29 (2008)
- Updated on 03 July 2014

Gerald Phiri (born 6 October 1988) is a Zambian sprinter who participates in 60 metre, 100 metre and 200 metre events in both indoor and outdoor events. He began competing in athletics while in school and continued his career at Texas A&M University. He became the first sprinter to achieve a 100–200 sprint double at the Big 12 Conference event and earned an All-American award. Phiri's international début in the 2009 World Championship in Athletics where he was eliminated in the semi-finals of the 100 metres. He won a silver medal in a 60 metres event in his second year at university, and secured three medals at the 2010 Big 12 Conference meet.

Phiri later competed in the 2012 IAAF World Indoor Championships, and qualified for the 2012 Summer Olympics in London. He was eliminated at the semi-final stage but competed strongly in events the following year. Phiri narrowly missed out on clinching a medal at the 2014 IAAF World Indoor Championships in the 60 metres, and withdrew from the African Championships in Athletics two years later because of an injury. He was unable to advance to the semi-finals of the 100 metres at the 2016 Summer Olympics after finishing fourth in his heat.

== Early and personal life ==
Phiri was born on 6 October 1988 in Ndola Central Hospital, Ndola, Zambia. He is the son of Huggins and Bestoria Phiri and has two brothers. His family moved to South Africa in 1996, but later migrated to the Mid Wales town of Welshpool after his mother found employment in the country. Phiri attended Abbeydale Grange School in Sheffield and trained with City of Sheffield and Dearne Athletic Club in South Yorkshire. He played football while in school and was offered a place in Sheffield Wednesday's academy but declined because he wanted to focus on athletics, and also played Basketball and Badminton. Phiri graduated from Texas A&M University in May 2012, and later moved to Orlando, Florida. He selected the university to have life-changing experiences. Phiri said in a 2012 interview that his sporting motivations were Usain Bolt, Yohan Blake and Tyson Gay. He formerly represented the United Kingdom but switched to Zambia in 2009, and holds dual citizenship of both countries.

== School, collegiate and early international career ==
He ran a wind-assisted time of 11.76 seconds and 11.85 seconds in a 100 metres event while in Year 7. It would have been a new national record but was not recognised because of him having recently arrived in the United Kingdom. Phiri was discovered by his physical education teacher the following year during his school's annual sports day and realised that he had talent in the sport after winning his event at the 2003 English Schools' Athletics Championships. In 2005 he recorded the third-fastest 100 metres time in the UK Under-17 sprinters' history, at 10.51 seconds. Phiri reached the semi-finals of the 100 metres at the UK (AAA) Senior Championships, and made the 60 metres indoors final in the same event, and finished fifth overall. He attributed the poor results to having issues with his back despite winter training. Phiri was the 2006 England Schools Champion, and earned the Harold Whitham Award for securing the best finish for a Sheffield athlete in the event.

In his first year at university (2008) Phiri finished in sixth place in 60 metres at NCAA Indoors, and became the first male sprinter in the history of the Big 12 Conference to achieve a 100–200 sprint double in the conference event. His achievements led to him earning an All-American award. The following season Phiri was part of a relay squad that established a new Texas A&M time record in the 4 x 100 metres event, and recorded the 2009 top collegiate time in the process. He competed in the 4 x 200 metres event along with three other athletes and broke a 19-year school record. Phiri made his international athletics début at the 2009 World Championships in Athletics where he finished second in his heat of the 100 metres behind Usain Bolt. He was eliminated in the event's semi-final stage and later pulled out of the tournament due to an injury.

During his junior year (2010) Phiri won the NCAA silver medal in the 60 meters with a season-best time of 6.60 seconds, and placed fourth in the 100 meters and finished eighth in the 200 meters at the 2010 NCAA Division I Outdoor Track and Field Championships. At the Big 12 Conference meet he secured the gold medal in the 60 metres, the silver medal in the indoor 60 metres, and was the bronze medallist in the indoor 200 metres. That same year Phiri competed as part of a relay team which established a new time record in the 4 x 200 metres in securing the Texas relays title (one minute, 22:31 seconds), and secured five victories as part of a 4 x 100 metres relay squad. He recorded an indoor career best time of 20:87 seconds en route to winning the Texas A&M Conference Challenge in his final collegiate sporting year. Phiri won the 100 metres event at the 2011 Texas Relays, with a new time record of 10:06 seconds. He competed in the 100 metres at the 2011 World Championships in Athletics but did not advance to the semi-finals of the event after finishing sixth in his heat.

== Olympics and further international competition ==
=== 2012–2013 ===
Phiri made the semi-finals of the men's 60 metres at the 2012 IAAF World Indoor Championships by finishing second in the first heat but was unable to start the race. He qualified for the 2012 Summer Olympics in London because his fastest time of 10:06 seconds met the "B" standard time. He prepared for the Olympics by travelling to the Netherlands and adapted to a new climate and time zone. Phiri made the semi-finals of the 100 metres but did not progress into the final after finishing fifth in the event's second heat. He finished seventh in the 100 metres at the 2012 running at the Stockholm Bauhaus Athletics. Phiri secured a third-place finish in the 100 metres at the 2012 Padua International Athletics Meeting, with a time of 10:20 seconds. He won the 60 metres event at the 2013 New Balance Indoor Grand Prix in Boston with a time of 6.97 seconds. Phiri made it to the semi-finals of that year's running of the Adidas Grand Prix in New York City where he secured a fourth-place finish in his heat in the 100 metres which meant he did not progress to the final of the event. He recorded a ten-second time at an IFAM Meeting in Oordegem on 1 June.

=== 2014–present ===
He was selected to represent Zambia at the 2014 IAAF World Indoor Championships in Poland. Phiri won his heat in the 60 metres with a time of 6.59 seconds and was able to advance to the semi-finals of the event. He finished second in the third heat of the semi-finals, but narrowly missed out on achieving a medal by finishing fifth in the final with the same time as the third and fourth-place finishers. Phiri progressed to the final of the 100 metres in the 2016 African Championships in Athletics but withdrew due to a hip injury he sustained in the semi-finals of the event and was unable to participate in the 4 x 100 metres relay race. At the 2016 Summer Olympics in Rio de Janeiro, he placed fourth with a time of 10.27 seconds in his heat of the 100 metres and did not qualify for the semi-finals. Phiri was the flag bearer for Zambia at the closing ceremony.

== Doping suspension ==
On March 17, 2025, Phiri was provisionally suspended amid a joint investigation by the Athletics Integrity Unit and US Anti-Doping Agency after three track athletes who are coached by him tested positive for metabolites of GW1516 (also known as Cardarine), a metabolic modulator, which is a non-specified substance prohibited at all times under the Prohibited List of the World Anti-Doping Agency (WADA).
