= Ngozi Mwanamwambwa =

Zambian sprinter

Ngozi Mwanamwambwa Asinga
Personal information
- Nationality: Zambian
- Born: 25 February 1971 (age 55)

Sport
- Sport: Sprinting
- Event: 100 metres
- College team: Principia College

Ngozi Mwanamwambwa Asinga (born 25 February 1971) is a Zambian former sprinter. She competed in the women's 100 metres, 200 metres and 400 metres at the 1992 Summer Olympics. She also competed in the women's 400 metres at the 1996 Summer Olympics. She is the wife of Surinamese former athlete Tommy Asinga. She attended Principia College. A seven-time NCAA Division III All-American in track, Ngozi earned top-three finishes in the 100, 200 and 400 metres races, and was the 1992 Division III national champion in the 200 metres.
