= Tonny Wamulwa =

Zambian long-distance runner (born 1989)

Personal information
- Born: 3 August 1989 (age 36) Mongu, Zambia
- Height: 1.64 m (5 ft 5 in)

Anthony Wamulwa (born 3 August 1989) is a Zambian long-distance runner who specializes in the 5000 metres.

As a junior athlete, he finished tenth (in 3000 metres) at the 2005 World Youth Championships, tenth at the 2006 Commonwealth Games, seventh at the 2006 World Junior Championships and fifth at the 2008 World Junior Championships. In 2008 he won the gold medal at the Southern Africa Region Cross Country Championships, which meant he had qualified for the 2008 World Cross Country Championships in Edinburgh, where he finished seventeenth out of 109 athletes in the junior race. He had finished ninth in 2007.

He also competed at the 2007 World Championships and the 2008 Olympic Games without reaching the final.

== Personal bests ==
- 1500 metres - 3:51.80 min (2005)
- 3000 metres - 7:49.51 min (2008)
- 5000 metres - 13:25.58 min (2008)
