= National Olympic Committee of Zambia =

National Olympic Committee

- Country: Zambia
- Code: ZAM
- Created: 1951
- Recognized: 1963
- Headquarters: Lusaka
- President: Alfred Foloko
- Secretary General: Boniface Kambikambi
- Website: www.nocz.org

The National Olympic Committee of Zambia (IOC code: ZAM) is the National Olympic Committee representing Zambia. It was created in 1951 as the National Olympic Committee of Northern Rhodesia and recognised by the IOC in 1963.

Zambia made its debut at the 1968 Summer Olympics in Mexico City. Previously, it competed as Northern Rhodesia in 1964 (changing its name on the day of the closing ceremony) and under the banner of Rhodesia in 1960.

Since 2010, the Committee, in conjunction with the International Olympic Committee (IOC) and the Government of Zambia have operated an Olympic Youth Development Center (OYDC) in Lusaka, Zambia. The center was opened as a pilot project by the IOC and is open to all youth in the country.

== Presidents of Committee ==
- present – Mr. Alfred Foloko
- predecessor – Ms. Miriam Moyo

== Vice Presidents of Committee ==
- present – Ms. Hazel Kennedy

== Executive Board 2017-2021 ==
- President – Mr. Alfred Foloko
- Vice President – Ms. Hazel Kennedy
- Secretary-General – Mr. Boniface Kambikambi
- Treasurer – Mr. Victor Banda
- Members – Mr. Guy Phiri, Mr. Dickson Jere, Mrs. Susanna Dakik, Ms. Suwilanji Mpondela

== Secretariat Staff ==
- As of 2021

The National Olympic Committee of Zambia (NOCZ) Secretariat is located at OlympAfrica Centre Stand Number 27007 New Kasangula Road Lusaka. Currently, NOC Zambia employs eight full-time employees.

- Gloria Makungu – Administration Officer
- Chaelelwa Kazika – Accounts Manager
- Chipo Mulenga – Programmes Officer
- Tinyiko Lucert Kamanga – Programmes Officer: Olympafrica Centre
- Prudence Nswana – Safe Sport Officer
- Felix Munyika – Communications and Marketing Officer
- Francis Mwansa – Office Assistant
- Jabess Zulu – Caretaker: Olympafrica Centre

== eqUIP Intern Programme ==
Five students/and or recent graduates have benefitted from the Internship Programme partnership between the Commonwealth Games Foundation and NOC Zambia (Commonwealth Games Association of Zambia).

- Present – Mr. Chishimba Bwalya - University of Zambia (2020-2021)
- Past – Ms. Denise Cohen - Cavendish University (2019-2020)
- Past – Mr. Felix Munyika - University of Zambia (2018-2019)
- Past – Mr. Charles Ziwa - University of Zambia (2017-2018)
- Past – Ms. Tinyiko Lucert Kamanga - Copperbelt University (2016-2017)

== See also ==
- Zambia at the Olympics
- Zambia at the Commonwealth Games
