= Zambian kwacha =

Official currency of Zambia

ISO 4217
- Code: ZMW (numeric: 967) before 2013: ZMK
- Subunit: 0.01

Units of account
- Symbol: K, ZK
- Subunit
- 1/100: ngwee
- Symbol
- ngwee: N

Denominations
- Banknotes
- Freq. used: 2, 5, 10, 20, 50, 100, 200, 500 kwacha
- Coins
- Freq. used: 5, 10, 50 ngwee, 1, 2, 5 kwacha

Demographics
- Official user(s): Zambia
- Unofficial users: ZimbabweMalawi (used in the border areas between Zambia & Zimbabwe and also Zambia & Malawi)

Issuance
- Central bank: Bank of Zambia
- Website: www.boz.zm
- Printer: G&D; Johan Enschede en Zonen
- Website: www.gi-de.com www.joh-enschede.nl

Valuation
- Inflation: 15.78%
- Source: www.zamstats.gov.zm, January 2024 est.
- Method: CPI

Zambian kwacha (sign: K; code: ZMW) is the official currency of Zambia, issued by the Bank of Zambia. It is subdivided into 100 ngwee. On 31 March 2025, the Bank of Zambia launched the new "Heritage Series"—a refreshed currency family of six banknotes (K10, K20, 50, 100, K200, K500) and six coins (5 ngwee, 10 ngwee, 50 ngwee, K1, K2, K5)—featuring enhanced security and national heritage themes.

== Etymology ==
The name kwacha derives from the Nyanja, Bemba, and Tonga language word for "dawn", alluding to the Zambian nationalist slogan of a "new dawn of freedom". The name ngwee translates as "bright" in the Nyanja language.

== History ==
Prior to independence in 1964, the Rhodesia and Nyasaland pound was the legal tender of the British protectorate of Northern Rhodesia. Banknotes of 10 shillings, 1, 5, and 10 pounds issued by the Central Africa Currency Board were in circulation, together with coins of 1/2, 1, 3, 6 pence, and 1, 2, 2 1/2, and 5 shillings. After independence, the Bank of Zambia issued the first Zambian currency, the Zambian pound, in 1964. The issued paper bills and coins were of similar denominations as these used before independence, except for the 10 pounds note, which was never issued by the Bank of Zambia. A new design to depict the newly independent country's history and struggle was adopted. The two currencies – the Rhodesia and Nyasaland pound and the Zambian pound, were allowed to circulate in parallel until December 15, 1965, when the South Rhodesian pound bills and coins were withdrawn from circulation, except for the 3 pence coin which was allowed to circulate alongside its Zambian alternative for a brief period.

On July 1, 1966, the parliament approved the arrangements of the decimal currency system (Act 40 of 1966), changing the main currency unit to Kwacha, with one kwacha being equal to 100 ngwee. The exchange rate was set to one kwacha equivalent to ten Zambian shillings, or one half of a Zambian pound. Thus, by January 16, 1968, all Zambian pound notes and coins were removed from circulation and replaced by the new kwacha notes, and ngwee coins. The Zambian pound notes of 10 shillings, 1, and 5 pounds were changed into 1, 2 and 10 kwacha respectively, a note of 50 ngwee was issued to replace the old 5 shillings coin, alongside a new note of 20 kwacha. Ngwee coins with the denominations of 1, 2, 5, 10, and 20 ngwee replacing the existing 1, 3, 6 pence, 1, and 2 shillings coins respectively. The Zambian pound notes, and coins ceased to be a legal tender on January 31, 1974.

At the very beginning, the kwacha was pegged to the pound sterling at a fixed rate of 1.7094 kwacha per 1 pound. Yet, after the devaluation of the US dollar on August 15, 1971, Zambia broke all its currency's ties to the British monetary unit, and pegged the kwacha to the American monetary unit. These reforms resulted in a reduction of the kwacha's gold standard by 7.8%. A few months later, the British Chancellor of the Exchequer Anthony Barber, announced the demise of the Sterling area, and flotation of the sterling pound, causing Zambia to renounce the monetary privileges once enjoyed as a member state.

Throughout the years, the Zambian currency suffered high inflation, forcing the Bank of Zambia to introduce high value denominations in 2003, including 20,000 bills to facilitate transactions. In 2013, a new, redenominated kwacha was introduced. The value of Zambian currency dropped following redenomination; the exchange rate was 22 kwacha to one U.S. dollar in April 2021. After the 2021 Zambian general election saw a defeat for Edgar Lungu, the currency's depreciation was reversed; as of 27 August 2021 one U.S. dollar was exchanged for about 16 kwacha. Since the inauguration of president Hakainde Hichilema in 2021, the kwacha has enjoyed a steady exchange rate hovering around 17 to 19 per one U.S. dollar well into the year 2023, however following the drought, reduced economic activity and up to 15 hours of load-shedding to name a few; the economy had stagnated and the kwacha depreciated to an all time high of one U.S. dollar per 27 Zambian kwacha. Following the re-election of the UPND government under Hakainde Hichilema in August 2026, the Kwacha has hovered around 17.80 to 19.00 per US Dollar. Appreciating value after international and local markets gain confidence from a successful debt restructuring, high copper output and rule of law.

== Coins ==
In 1968, bronze 1 and 2 ngwee and cupro-nickel 5, 10 and 20 ngwee were introduced. These coins all depicted president Kenneth Kaunda on the obverse and flora and fauna on the reverse. A twelve sided 50 ngwee coin was introduced in 1979 to replace the 50 ngwee note and featured commemorative FAO themes.

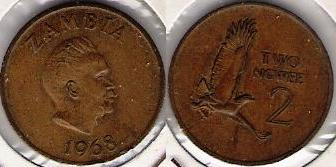
2 Zambian ngwee coin (1968)

In 1982, copper-clad-steel replaced bronze in the 1 and 2 ngwee. These two were struck until 1983, with production of the 5 and 10 ngwee ceasing in 1987 and that of the 20 ngwee in 1988. Nickel-brass 1 kwacha coins were introduced in 1989 and depicted "Bank of Zambia" on the edges. The period of circulation for this coin was brief as inflation rates skyrocketed.

In 1992, a new, smaller coinage was introduced consisting of nickel-plated-steel 25 and 50 ngwee and brass 1, 5 and 10 kwacha. The coins depict the national crest on the obverse and native fauna on the reverse. The coins were issued only one year and then discontinued as the economic crisis dragged on.

All these coins, both from the older and newer series still remain legal tender. However, the value of the metal in the coins is worth more than their irrelevant face value, so they are never seen or used in normal trade. The only place coins might be seen today is when they are sold as souvenirs to tourists.

On January 1, 2013, new coins were introduced, namely for 5, 10, 50 ngwee and 1 kwacha.

Coins of the new kwacha (2013 series)

Denomination	Dates
5 ngwee	2013–present
10 ngwee	2013–present
50 ngwee	2013–present
1 kwacha	2013–present

Coins of the Zambian kwacha (2012 "Revaluation" issue)
Value	Technical parameters				Description			Date of issue
Value	Diameter	Thickness	Composition	Edge	Obverse	Reverse	Date	Date of issue
5 ngwee	19 mm	1.55 mm	Nickel-plated steel	Plain	Coat of arms of Zambia	Zambezi indigobird	2012	January 1, 2013
10 ngwee	20 mm	1.57 mm	Brass-plated steel	Plain	Coat of arms of Zambia	Eland	2012	January 1, 2013
50 ngwee	21 mm	1.60 mm	Brass-plated steel	Reeded	Coat of arms of Zambia	African elephant	2012	January 1, 2013
1 kwacha	24 mm	1.73 mm	Nickel-plated steel	Reeded	Coat of arms of Zambia	Zambian barbet	2012	January 1, 2013

== Banknotes ==
The Zambian kwacha was first issued in 1968 to replace the Zambian pound. The design of the kwacha bill changed as time went on, also, different bills were either introduced in or withdrawn from circulation. Seven emissions of the first kwacha are known to exist, while only one emission of the second kwacha was introduced in circulation on January 1, 2013, and still existing since then without any changes in design or security features. Each emission share similar general features in design throughout all the banknotes, with slight changes concerning the colors and the activity based theme on the reverse of the banknotes.

=== First kwacha (1968–2012) ===
==== First issue (1968) ====
The first issue of the first kwacha was issued in 1968. The series comprised five banknotes of 50 ngwee, 1, 2, 10, and 20 kwacha. The obverse of the five banknotes featured a portrait of president Kenneth Kaunda in tribal outfit on the right, together with the Coat of Arms of Zambia on the left on the 50 ngwee banknote, or at upper center on the kwacha banknotes. The reverse showed different activity based themes reflecting life in Zambia. The banknotes were printed by Thomas De La Rue & Co. Limited, and bore the signature of Dr Justin B. Zulu, Bank of Zambia's second governor. Apart from the 50 ngwee banknote, the kwacha banknotes had president Kenneth Kaunda as a watermark. Specimen banknotes were issued for each denomination, with the word SPECIMEN overprint in red sans on both the obverse and reverse.

Denomination	Pick	Obverse	Reverse	F.I^{1}	L.I^{2}	Description
Fifty Ngwee	P-4			1968	1968	Obverse: Red-violet on multicolor underprint. A portrait of president Kenneth Kaunda in tribal outfit on the right. Coat of Arms on the left. A dot between the currency symbol and face value. Reverse: Southern lechwe in the Kafue Flats. Watermark: None
One Kwacha	P-5			1968	1968	Obverse: Dark brown on multicolor underprint. A portrait of president Kenneth Kaunda in tribal outfit on the right. Coat of Arms at upper center. A dot between the currency symbol and face value. Reverse: Farmer plowing field with tractor. Another two farmers plowing the same field with four oxen. Watermark: President Kenneth Kaunda
Two Kwacha	P-6			1968	1968	Obverse: Green on multicolor underprint. A portrait of president Kenneth Kaunda in tribal outfit on the right. Coat of Arms at upper center. A dot between the currency symbol and face value. Reverse: Copper mining facility. Mining tower at the center, and conveyor belt on the left. Watermark: President Kenneth Kaunda
Ten Kwacha	P-7			1968	1968	Obverse: Blue on multicolor underprint. A portrait of president Kenneth Kaunda in tribal outfit on the right. Coat of Arms at upper center. A dot between the currency symbol and face value. Reverse: Victoria Falls on the Zambezi River at center. Watermark: President Kenneth Kaunda
Twenty Kwacha	P-8			1968	1968	Obverse: Purple on multicolor underprint. A portrait of president Kenneth Kaunda in tribal outfit on the right. Coat of Arms at upper center. A dot between the currency symbol and face value. Reverse: National Assembly building in Lusaka at center. Watermark: President Kenneth Kaunda

^{1} First Issued, refers to the year of first issue of the actual banknote from the same emission.
^{2} Last Issued: refers to the year of last issue of the actual banknote from the same emission.

==== Second emission (1969–1973) ====
In 1969, a second emission of the Zambian kwacha was issued. Initially, the emission comprised the same five banknotes of the first emission, and all five denominations bore the signatures of Dr Justin B. Zulu, Mr Valentine S. Musakanya, and that of Mr Bitwell R. Kuwani, the second, third, and forth governors of the Bank of Zambia, respectively, except for the 50 ngwee bills that never existed with Dr Zulu's signature, as well as the 1 kwacha bills that never showed Mr Kuwani's signature. The second emission banknotes were exactly similar to these of the first emission, except for a slight difference, in which the dot (•) between the currency symbol and the face value was removed. The banknotes were printed by Thomas De La Rue & Co. Limited, and specimen banknotes were issued for each denomination, with the word SPECIMEN overprint in red sans on both the obverse and reverse.

Denomination	Pick	Obverse	Reverse	F.I^{1}	L.I^{2}	Description
Fifty Ngwee	P-9			1970	1972	Obverse: Red-violet on multicolor underprint. A portrait of president Kenneth Kaunda in tribal outfit on the right. Coat of Arms on the left. No dot between the currency symbol and face value. Reverse: Southern lechwe in the Kafue Flats. Watermark: President Kenneth Kaunda
One Kwacha	P-10			1969	1972	Obverse: Dark brown on multicolor underprint. A portrait of president Kenneth Kaunda in tribal outfit on the right. Coat of Arms at upper center. No dot between the currency symbol and face value. Reverse: Farmer plowing field with tractor. Another two farmers plowing the same field with four oxen. Watermark: President Kenneth Kaunda
Two Kwacha	P-11			1969	1973	Obverse: Green on multicolor underprint. A portrait of president Kenneth Kaunda in tribal outfit on the right. Coat of Arms at upper center. No dot between the currency symbol and face value. Reverse: Copper mining facility. Mining tower at the center, and conveyor belt on the left. Watermark: President Kenneth Kaunda
Ten Kwacha	P-12			1969	1973	Obverse: Blue on multicolor underprint. A portrait of president Kenneth Kaunda in tribal outfit on the right. Coat of Arms at upper center. No dot between the currency symbol and face value. Reverse: Victoria Falls on the Zambezi River at center. Watermark: President Kenneth Kaunda
Twenty Kwacha	P-13			1969	1973	Obverse: Purple on multicolor underprint. A portrait of president Kenneth Kaunda in tribal outfit on the right. Coat of Arms at upper center. No dot between the currency symbol and face value. Reverse: National Assembly building in Lusaka at center. Watermark: President Kenneth Kaunda

^{1} First Issued, refers to the year of first issue of the actual banknote from the same emission.
^{2} Last Issued: refers to the year of last issue of the actual banknote from the same emission.

During the second emission period, a commemorative banknote of 1 kwacha was issued in celebration of the declaration of One-party state on December 13, 1972. The banknote was not a legal tender, and had a different frame design than the banknotes of both, the first and second issues.

Later on in 1973, the Bank of Zambia issued the 5 kwacha banknote for the first time. A red-violet on multicolour underprint design was chosen for the new bill note. The new design resulted in a lot of confusion between the existing 50 ngwee bill and the new 5 kwacha one. This urged the Bank of Zambia to adopt a new design for the 50 ngwee banknotes in 1973. A new black and lilac on multicolor underprint was used for easy recognition, nevertheless, this was the last issue of the 50 ngwee banknotes as it was replaced later by a coin. The two new banknotes bore the signature of Mr Bitwell R. Kuwani, and were printed by Thomas De La Rue & Co. Limited. Specimen banknotes were issued for both denominations, with the word SPECIMEN overprint in red sans on both the obverse and reverse.

Denomination	Pick	Obverse	Reverse	F.I^{1}	L.I^{2}	Description
Fifty Ngwee	P-14			1973	1973	Obverse: Black and lilac on multicolor underprint. A portrait of president Kenneth Kaunda in tribal outfit on the right. Coat of Arms at upper center. A depiction of an African fish eagle flying in front of the Sun on the left. No dot between the currency symbol and face value. Reverse: Miners in copper mine. Watermark: President Kenneth Kaunda
Five Kwacha	P-15			1973	1973	Obverse: Red-violet on multicolor underprint. A portrait of president Kenneth Kaunda in tribal outfit on the right. Coat of Arms at upper center. No dot between the currency symbol and face value. Reverse: Child painting and children in class at center. School on the left. Watermark: President Kenneth Kaunda

^{1} First Issued, refers to the year of first issue of the actual banknote from the same emission.
^{2} Last Issued: refers to the year of last issue of the actual banknote from the same emission.

==== Third issue (1974–1976) ====
Prior to the third issue, short-lived designs of the obverses of the 10 and 20 kwacha banknotes were introduced. The new banknotes were printed by the English engraving, and printing company Bradbury, Wilkinson & Co. The new designs featured an older portrait of president Kenneth Kaunda, without the usual frame design, and bearing the signature of Mr Bitwell R. Kuwani. Specimen banknotes were issued for both banknotes, with the word SPECIMEN overprint in red sans on both the obverse and reverse. Thanks to their scarcity, both bills are the most expensive banknotes of the Zambian collection among notaphilists.

Denomination	Pick	Obverse	Reverse	F.I^{1}	L.I^{2}	Description
Ten Kwacha	P-17			1974	1974	Obverse: Blue on multicolor underprint. An older portrait of president Kenneth Kaunda in tribal outfit on the right. Coat of Arms at upper center. Reverse: Victoria Falls on the Zambezi River at center.. Watermark: President Kenneth Kaunda
Twenty Kwacha	P-18			1974	1974	Obverse: Red and purple on multicolor underprint. An older portrait of president Kenneth Kaunda in tribal outfit on the right. Coat of Arms at upper center. Reverse: National Assembly building in Lusaka at center. Watermark: President Kenneth Kaunda

^{1} First Issued, refers to the year of first issue of the actual banknote from the same emission.
^{2} Last Issued: refers to the year of last issue of the actual banknote from the same emission.

In 1976, a four bills third issue was issued, in which the old frame design was re-adopted once again. Banknotes with all denominations were reproduced, except for the twenty kwacha bill, which was never issued in spite of being redesigned. All bills bore the signatures of Mr Luke J. Mwananshiku, the fifth governors of the Bank of Zambia, except for the two kwacha banknotes, which retained the signature of Mr Bitwell R. Kuwani. The third emission banknotes were exactly similar to these of the second emission, except for president Kenneth Kaunda's portrait, where an older portrait replaced the younger portrait appearing on the first, and second emissions. The banknotes were once again printed by Thomas De La Rue & Co. Limited, and specimen banknotes were issued for each denomination, with the word SPECIMEN overprint in red sans on both the obverse and reverse.

Denomination	Pick	Obverse	Reverse	F.I^{1}	L.I^{2}	Description
One Kwacha	P-19			1976	1980	Obverse: Dark brown on multicolor underprint. An older portrait of president Kenneth Kaunda in tribal outfit on the right. Coat of Arms at upper center. Reverse: Farmer plowing field with tractor. Another two farmers plowing the same field with four oxen. Watermark: President Kenneth Kaunda
Two Kwacha	P-20			1976	1980	Obverse: Green on multicolor underprint. An older portrait of president Kenneth Kaunda in tribal outfit on the right. Coat of Arms at upper center. Reverse: Copper mining facility. Mining tower at the center, and conveyor belt on the left. Watermark: President Kenneth Kaunda
Five Kwacha	P-21			1976	1980	Obverse: Red-violet on multicolor underprint. An older portrait of president Kenneth Kaunda in tribal outfit on the right. Coat of Arms at upper center. Reverse: Child painting and children in class at center. School on the left. Watermark: President Kenneth Kaunda
Ten Kwacha	P-22			1976	1980	Obverse: Blue on multicolor underprint. An older portrait of president Kenneth Kaunda in tribal outfit on the right. Coat of Arms at upper center. Reverse: Victoria Falls on the Zambezi River at center. Watermark: President Kenneth Kaunda
Twenty Kwacha	P-22A			N/A	N/A	Obverse: Purple, and red on multicolor underprint. An older portrait of president Kenneth Kaunda in tribal outfit on the right. Coat of Arms at upper center. Reverse: National Assembly building in Lusaka at center. Watermark: President Kenneth Kaunda

^{1} First Issued, refers to the year of first issue of the actual banknote from the same emission.
^{2} Last Issued: refers to the year of last issue of the actual banknote from the same emission.

Denomination	Dates
50 ngwee	1968–1973
1 kwacha	1968–1988
2 kwacha	1968–1989
5 kwacha	1973–1989
10 kwacha	1968–1991
20 kwacha	1968–1992
50 kwacha	1986–2013
100 kwacha	1991–2013
500 kwacha	1991–2013
1000 kwacha	1992–2013
5000 kwacha	1992–2013
10,000 kwacha	1992–2013
20,000 kwacha	2003–2013
50,000 kwacha	2003–2013

Until 1991, all Zambian banknotes featured a portrait of President Kenneth Kaunda on the obverse. After 1992, all notes have instead featured a fish eagle on the obverse. After 1989, all the reverses featured the Chainbreaker statue. In 2003, Zambia became the first African country to issue polymer banknotes. The 500 and 1000 kwacha were both printed on polymer. Although the old 20 kwacha note was still in circulation until 2012, such is the rarity of this note that most major retailers rounded prices up to the nearest 50 kwacha when calculating a total. Most items in major supermarkets were displayed using 20 kwacha in the value (e.g., 1980 kwacha).

=== New Kwacha (2012 series) ===
On January 23, 2012, the Bank of Zambia proposed certain measures in regards of the redenomination of the Zambian kwacha. Such recommendations were initially approved by the government, being one of the measures required to address costs associated with the continuous devaluation of the national currency, due to depreciation throughout time, as a direct result of several years of high inflation rates that characterized the national economy during the late decades of the 20th century, and the early years of the 21st century. The recommendations were assented to the parliament on November 3, 2012. Later, The Re-Domination of Currency Act (Act 8 of 2012) was enacted on December 3, 2012.

The old currency unit was divided by 1000, hence, removing three zeros from the preexisting K50,000, K20,000, K10,000, K5,000, and K1,000. The lower denominations of K500, K100, and K50 were also divided by 1000 and were changed into the 50, 10, and 5 Ngwee coins respectively. On the other hand, the preexisting K20 banknote was removed from circulation due to its extremely low purchasing power.

The Bank of Zambia announced January 1, 2013, as the changeover date. On the same day, the new redenominated currency became the legal tender of Zambia. The old and new currencies were allowed to circulate side by side for a transition period of six months, until June 30, 2013. During this period, the old currency was denoted by 'K', whilst the new one was denoted by 'KR'. After the six-month period, the 'KR' symbol was dropped, and the new currency was referred to by the 'K' symbol.

By June 26, 2013, the Bank of Zambia managed to withdraw 3.7 trillion Kwacha in old banknotes, accumulating to about 95.3% of the circulating banknotes. Although the old currency ceased to be legal tender four days later, the Bank of Zambia Deputy Governor, announced that residents who were still holding to the old currency, especially those living in rural areas, could still be able to exchange the old currency for the new one through commercial banks, and other designated agents.

==== Design ====
While being the first African country to introduce polymer banknotes in 2003, the new currency banknotes are all printed on paper, with advanced security features. The six newly issued banknotes share multiple common features on both the obverse and reverse, together with few different features, that are unique for each banknote. All banknotes have the same height of 70 mm, the 2 Kwacha, and 5 Kwacha banknotes are 140 mm wide, whilst the rest of the banknotes are 145 mm wide. All new banknotes were printed by the German printing company G&D, except for the 2015 issue of the 100 Kwacha banknote, which was printed by the Dutch Royal Joh. Enschedé.

Obverse

The obverse of the new currency features four common features, found on the obverse of all the six banknotes, and a single unique feature for each one of them. The common features are: the African fish eagle which considered, by far, the primary recognition feature on all the Zambian banknotes, together with the coat of arms, the signature of the Bank of Zambia Governor and obligation to pay the sum indicated on the banknote, and the face value of the specified banknote. Each banknote features a unique indigenous tree from the abundant forests covering the country.

Reverse

The reverse features the Freedom Statue in Lusaka, the issuing authority of legal tenders in Zambia, Bank of Zambia, in the middle at the top, the face value of the banknote in words in the lower left corner, and in numerals in the other three corners. There is also a unique depiction of wildlife in Zambia, together with an activity based theme on each reverse of the six banknotes.

Denomination	Pick	Obverse	Reverse	Tree	Reverse Theme	Wildlife depiction
Two Kwacha	P-49			Teak	Women trading in market place	Roan antelope
Five Kwacha	P-50			Mopane	Cassava plant and tuber	Lion
Ten Kwacha	P-51			Sugar plum	Farmers harvesting wheat	Porcupine
Twenty Kwacha	P-52			Mukwa	Miners working in copper mine	Black Lechwe
Fifty Kwacha	P-53			Sycamore	Bank of Zambia Headquarters, Lusaka	Leopard
One Hundred Kwacha	P-54			Baobab	National Assembly building, Lusaka	African buffalo

==== Security features ====
Multiple security features were applied to avoid counterfeit banknotes. Anti-counterfeiting measures used included holograms, multi-colored bills, embedded devices such as strips, microprinting, watermarks and different types of optically variable inks, and the use of design features which prevent counterfeiting by photocopying or scanning.

Feature	Two Kwacha	Five Kwacha	Ten Kwacha	Twenty Kwacha	Fifty Kwacha	One Hundred Kwacha
EURion constellation	No	Yes	Yes	Yes	Yes	Yes
Optically Variable Magnetic Ink	No	Yes	Yes	Yes	Yes	Yes
Microprinting	Yes	Yes	Yes	Yes	Yes	Yes
Iridescent stripe	Yes	Yes	Yes	Yes	Yes	Yes
See-through registration device	Yes	Yes	Yes	Yes	Yes	Yes
Serial Numbers	Yes	Yes	Yes	Yes	Yes	Yes
Latent Image	Yes	Yes	No	No	No	No
Watermark	Yes	Yes	Yes	Yes	Yes	Yes
Security thread	Yes	Yes	Yes	No	No	No
Holographic strip	No	No	Yes	Yes	Yes	Yes
Intaglio	Yes	Yes	Yes	Yes	Yes	Yes
Holographic security thread	No	No	No	Yes	Yes	Yes
Feature	Two Kwacha	Five Kwacha	Ten Kwacha	Twenty Kwacha	Fifty Kwacha	One Hundred Kwacha

=== Commemorative banknotes ===
Since its inauguration in 1964 and until the second half of 2016, the Bank of Zambia had issued two commemorative banknotes. The first commemorative banknote was a One Kwacha banknote issued in 1973, commemorating the birth of the second republic, an incident in which the regime, led by president Kenneth Kaunda, decided on December 13, 1972, to set up a One-party state as from January 1, 1973. Apart from the issued note, a specimen banknote was also issued in celebration of the same occasion.

On October 23, 2014, one day before the celebrations of the independence day, the Bank of Zambia revealed its second ever commemorative banknote. A Fifty Kwacha banknote was issued commemorating the 50th Independence Anniversary. Unlike the previous commemorative banknotes and coins of Zambia, the new commemorative banknote was the first commemorative banknote allowed in circulation as a legal tender in the country, bearing the same features of the existing Fifty Kwacha bills.

Denomination	Pick	Obverse	Reverse	Year	Printer	Description
One Kwacha	P-16a			1973	TDLR	Obverse: Red-orange, and brown on multicolor underprint. A portrait of president Kenneth Kaunda on the right. Reverse: President Kenneth Kaunda signing the declaration of the One-party state on the left, crowd in the middle. Commemorative Text: THE BIRTH OF THE SECOND REPUBLIC December 13, 1972; Watermark: President Kenneth Kaunda
One Kwacha	P-16s			1973	TDLR	Obverse: Red-orange, and brown on multicolor underprint. A portrait of president Kenneth Kaunda on the right. SPECIMEN overprint in red sans. Reverse: President Kenneth Kaunda signing the declaration of the One-party state on the left, crowd in the middle. SPECIMEN overprint in red sans. Commemorative Text: THE BIRTH OF THE SECOND REPUBLIC December 13, 1972; Watermark: President Kenneth Kaunda
Fifty Kwacha	P-55			2014	G&D	Obverse: Blue on multicolor underprint. Coat of arms, dove, African fish eagle head, Big Tree National Monument in Kabwe, and African fish eagle perched on a branch. Reverse: Portraits of the presidents of Zambia since independence in 1964 and until 2014, clockwise from top: Kenneth Kaunda, Levy Mwanawasa, Michael Sata, Rupiah Banda, and Frederick Chiluba. Bank of Zambia Headquarters, and the Freedom Statue in Lusaka. Commemorative Text: 50th INDEPENDENCE ANNIVERSARY; Watermark: African fish eagle head

== Exchange Rates ==
As of 29 July 2024:

- $1= 26.18 kwacha

As of 14 October 2025:

- $1= 22.50 kwacha

=== Historical Exchange Rates ===
Kwacha per foreign currency unit, averaged over each year
Currency Units	2013	2014	2015	2016	2017	2018	2019	2020	2021	2022*	2023*
United States Dollar	5.35	▲6.15	▲8.64	▲10.31	▼9.53	▲10.51	▲12.91	▲18.31	▲19.69	▼16.87	▲18.47
South African Rand	0.56	▲0.57	▲0.67	▲0.70	▲0.72	▲0.79	▲0.89	▲1.12	▲1.33	▼1.05	▲1.09
British Pound	8.44	▲10.14	▲13.20	▲14.01	▼12.27	▲13.94	▲16.48	▲23.40	▲27.08	▼20.95	▲20.03
Euro	7.16	▲8.17	▲9.57	▲11.43	▼10.76	▲12.34	▲14.45	▲20.99	▲23.32	▼17.86	▲22.87
Chinese Renminbi	0.87	▲1.00	▲1.38	▲1.55	▼1.40	▲1.58	▲1.87	▲2.66	▲2.88	▼2.55	▲2.73

*Running Average as of 13 January 2023

Current ZMW exchange rates
From Google Finance:	AUD CAD CHF CNY EUR GBP HKD JPY USD ZAR
From Yahoo! Finance:	AUD CAD CHF CNY EUR GBP HKD JPY USD ZAR
From XE.com:	AUD CAD CHF CNY EUR GBP HKD JPY USD ZAR
From OANDA:	AUD CAD CHF CNY EUR GBP HKD JPY USD ZAR

== See also ==
- Kwacha
- Malawian kwacha
- Economy of Zambia

Preceded by: Zambian pound Ratio: 2 kwacha = 1 pound	Currency of Zambia; 1968 – December 31, 2012	Succeeded by: Second kwacha Reason: convenience of exchange Ratio: 1 second kwacha = 1000 first kwacha

Preceded by: First kwacha Ratio: 1 second kwacha = 1000 first kwacha	Currency of Zambia; January 1, 2013 –	Succeeded by: Current
