= Zambia one hundred kwacha note =

One Hundred Kwacha
- Country: Zambia
- Value: 100 Zambian kwacha
- Width: 145 mm
- Height: 70 mm
- Security features: Holograms, multi-colours, embedded strips, microprinting, watermarks and different types of optically variable inks, and the use of design features.
- Material used: Paper
- Years of printing: 2013-present (current design)

Obverse
- Design: Eagle, Baobab Tree, Coat of arms
- Design date: 2013

Reverse
- Design: Buffalo, National Assembly, Freedom Statue
- Design date: 2013

The one hundred kwacha note of Zambia is a denomination of the Zambian currency. The current paper note, first issued in 2013, features the Freedom Statue in Lusaka, the issuing authority of legal tender currency in Zambia. In the middle there is the National Assembly; the face value of the banknote is shown in words in the lower left corner, and in numerals in the other three corners, and the new printer imprint of Giesecke & Devrient at the lower right corner. There is also a buffalo on the reverse. The obverse features the African fish eagle, which is considered as the primary recognition of the Zambian banknote, together with the country's coat of arms, the signature of the Bank of Zambia Governor and obligation to pay the sum indicated on the banknote, and the face value of the specified banknote and the baobab tree. It is the highest denomination of banknote issued by the Bank of Zambia since January, 2013 when the currency was redenominated, as described in the next section.

== Redenomination of the kwacha with removal of three zeros ==
The old currency unit was divided by 1000, hence, removing three zeros from the preexisting K50,000, K20,000, K10,000, and K5,000. The lower denominations of K1000, K500, K100, and K50 were also divided by 1000 and the notes were replaced by 1 kwacha and 50, 10, and 5 ngwee coins respectively.

=== History of the redenomination ===
On January 23, 2012, the Bank of Zambia proposed the redenomination of the Zambian Kwacha. These measures were required to address costs arising from the continuous devaluation of the national currency. These measures were initially approved by the government. The continuous devaluation had been a direct result of several years of high inflation rates that affected the national economy during the late decades of the 20th century, and the early years of the 21st century.

On 22 August 2012 the Bank of Zambia issued a press release stating that the changeover date for the rebased currency had been set as 1 January 2013. The parliament assented to the recommendations on November 3, 2012, and the Redomination of Currency Act (Act 8 of 2012) was enacted on December 3, 2012.
