= Fifty kwacha =

Fifty Kwacha
(Zambia)
- Value: 50 Kwacha
- Width: 145 mm
- Height: 70 mm
- Security features: Holograms, multi-colours, embedded strips, microprinting, watermarks and different types of optically variable inks, and the use of design features which prevent counterfeiting by photocopying or scanning.
- Material used: Paper
- Years of printing: 2013-present

Obverse
- Design: Eagle, Sycomorus, Coat of arms
- Design date: 2013

Reverse
- Design: Five past Presidents, BOZ Headquarters, Freedom Statue
- Design date: 2014

The Bank of Zambia K50 note is a denomination of the Zambian currency. The current paper note was first issued in 2013 and in 2014 a new note was released a commemorative note to commemorate Zambia's 50th Independence anniversary.

The commemorative note on the reverse features portraits of the presidents of Zambia since independence in 1964 and until 2014 while the other normal note features an African leopard other features on the note are the Bank of Zambia Headquarters, and the Freedom Statue in Lusaka.

The obverse features an African fish eagle perched on a branch the coat of arms, a dove, an African fish eagle's head and the Big Tree National Monument in Kabwe.

== Designs ==
The fifty kwacha has two types of reverse designs which are both valid and in circulation in Zambia. The first reverse side was published in 2013.

== Commemorative banknote ==
On October 23, 2014, one day before the celebrations of the independence day, the Bank of Zambia revealed its second-ever commemorative banknote. A Fifty Kwacha banknote was issued commemorating the 50th Independence Anniversary. Unlike the previous commemorative banknotes and coins of Zambia, the new commemorative banknote was the first commemorative banknote allowed in circulation as a legal tender in the country, bearing the same features of the existing Fifty Kwacha bills.
