= Zambia at the 2024 World Aquatics Championships =

- Flag of Zambia
- FINA code: ZAM
- National federation: Zambia Amateur Swimming Union
- Website: swimzambia.org

in Doha, Qatar
- Competitors: 2 in 1 sport
- Medals: Gold 0 Silver 0 Bronze 0 Total 0

World Aquatics Championships appearances
- 1973; 1975; 1978; 1982; 1986; 1991; 1994; 1998; 2001; 2003; 2005; 2007; 2009; 2011; 2013; 2015; 2017; 2019; 2022; 2023; 2024

Zambia competed at the 2024 World Aquatics Championships in Doha, Qatar from 2 to 18 February.

== Competitors ==
The following is the list of competitors in the Championships.

Sport	Men	Women	Total
Swimming	1	1	2
Total	1	1	2

== Swimming ==
Zambia entered 2 swimmers.

Men

Athlete	Event	Heat		Semifinal		Final	
Athlete	Event	Time	Rank	Time	Rank	Time	Rank
Damien Shamambo	50 metre freestyle	25.31	72	Did not advance			
Damien Shamambo	100 metre breaststroke	Disqualified		Did not advance			

Women

Athlete	Event	Heat		Semifinal		Final	
Athlete	Event	Time	Rank	Time	Rank	Time	Rank
Mia Phiri	50 metre freestyle	26.61	49	Did not advance			
Mia Phiri	50 metre backstroke	29.61	34	Did not advance			
