= Freedom statue =

Freedom statue may refer to

- Freedom Statue, 1974 installation in Zambia
- Statue of Freedom, 1863 installation in the United States
- Freedom (statue), a life-size statue of Charlie Kirk
