= Zambia at the 2015 World Aquatics Championships =

- Flag of Zambia
- World Aquatics code: ZAM
- National federation: Zambian Swimming Federation

in Kazan, Russia
- Competitors: 4 in 1 sport
- Medals: Gold 0 Silver 0 Bronze 0 Total 0

World Aquatics Championships appearances
- 1973; 1975; 1978; 1982; 1986; 1991; 1994; 1998; 2001; 2003; 2005; 2007; 2009; 2011; 2013; 2015; 2017; 2019; 2022; 2023; 2024; 2025

Zambia competed at the 2015 World Aquatics Championships in Kazan, Russia from 24 July to 9 August 2015.

== Swimming ==
Zambian swimmers have achieved qualifying standards in the following events (up to a maximum of 2 swimmers in each event at the A-standard entry time, and 1 at the B-standard):

Men

Athlete	Event	Heat		Semifinal		Final	
Athlete	Event	Time	Rank	Time	Rank	Time	Rank
Alex Axiotis	50 m breaststroke	30.24	55	did not advance			
Alex Axiotis	100 m breaststroke	1:07.29	65	did not advance			
Ralph Goveia	50 m butterfly	25.16	46	did not advance			
Ralph Goveia	100 m butterfly	56.34	55	did not advance			

Women

Athlete	Event	Heat		Semifinal		Final	
Athlete	Event	Time	Rank	Time	Rank	Time	Rank
Jade Howard	50 m freestyle	26.99	58	did not advance			
Jade Howard	100 m freestyle	58.74	58	did not advance			
Tilka Paljk	100 m breaststroke	1:17.13	55	did not advance			
Tilka Paljk	200 m breaststroke	2:55.98	46	did not advance			

Mixed

Athlete	Event	Heat		Final	
Athlete	Event	Time	Rank	Time	Rank
Jade Howard; Alex Axiotis; Ralph Goveia; Tilka Paljk	4 × 100 m medley relay	4:14.40	20	did not advance	
