= Zambia at the 2023 World Aquatics Championships =

- Flag of Zambia
- FINA code: ZAM
- National federation: Zambia Amateur Swimming Union
- Website: swimzambia.org

in Fukuoka, Japan
- Competitors: 3 in 1 sport
- Medals: Gold 0 Silver 0 Bronze 0 Total 0

World Aquatics Championships appearances
- 1973; 1975; 1978; 1982; 1986; 1991; 1994; 1998; 2001; 2003; 2005; 2007; 2009; 2011; 2013; 2015; 2017; 2019; 2022; 2023; 2024

Zambia is set to compete at the 2023 World Aquatics Championships in Fukuoka, Japan from 14 to 30 July.

== Swimming ==
Zambia entered 3 swimmers.

Men

Athlete	Event	Heat		Semifinal		Final	
Athlete	Event	Time	Rank	Time	Rank	Time	Rank
Zach Moyo	50 metre breaststroke	30.05	48	Did not advance			
Zach Moyo	100 metre breaststroke	1:10.10	65	Did not advance			
Damien Shamambo	50 metre freestyle	24.22	73	Did not advance			
Damien Shamambo	50 metre butterfly	26.46	69	Did not advance			

Women

Athlete	Event	Heat		Semifinal		Final	
Athlete	Event	Time	Rank	Time	Rank	Time	Rank
Mia Phiri	50 metre freestyle	26.86	52	Did not advance			
Mia Phiri	50 metre backstroke	30.17 NR	42	Did not advance			
