= Zambia at the 2017 World Aquatics Championships =

- Flag of Zambia
- FINA code: ZAM
- National federation: Zambian Swimming Federation

in Budapest, Hungary
- Competitors: 3 in 1 sport
- Medals: Gold 0 Silver 0 Bronze 0 Total 0

World Aquatics Championships appearances
- 1973; 1975; 1978; 1982; 1986; 1991; 1994; 1998; 2001; 2003; 2005; 2007; 2009; 2011; 2013; 2015; 2017; 2019; 2022; 2023; 2024

Zambia competed at the 2017 World Aquatics Championships in Budapest, Hungary from 14 to 30 July.

== Swimming ==
Zambia received a Universality invitation from FINA to send three swimmers (two men and one woman) to the World Championships.

Athlete	Event	Heat		Semifinal		Final	
Athlete	Event	Time	Rank	Time	Rank	Time	Rank
Alex Axiotis	Men's 50 m breaststroke	30.65	63	did not advance			
Alex Axiotis	Men's 100 m breaststroke	1:08.50	68	did not advance			
Ralph Goveia	Men's 50 m butterfly	24.56	39	did not advance			
Ralph Goveia	Men's 100 m butterfly	54.86	53	did not advance			
Tilka Paljk	Women's 50 m breaststroke	32.72	32	did not advance			
Tilka Paljk	Women's 100 m breaststroke	1:12.65	36	did not advance			
