= Zambia at the 2011 World Aquatics Championships =

- Flag of Zambia
- FINA code: ZAM
- National federation: Zambian Swimming Federation

in Shanghai, China
- Competitors: 3 in 1 sport
- Medals: Gold 0 Silver 0 Bronze 0 Total 0

World Aquatics Championships appearances
- 1973; 1975; 1978; 1982; 1986; 1991; 1994; 1998; 2001; 2003; 2005; 2007; 2009; 2011; 2013; 2015; 2017; 2019; 2022; 2023; 2024

Zambia competed at the 2011 World Aquatics Championships in Shanghai, China between 16 and 31 July.

== Swimming ==
Zambia qualified 3 swimmers.

Men

Athlete	Event	Heats		Semifinals		Final	
Athlete	Event	Time	Rank	Time	Rank	Time	Rank
Zane Jordan	Men's 50 m backstroke	27.12	28	did not advance			
Zane Jordan	Men's 100 m backstroke	59.33	46	did not advance			
Mark Thompson	Men's 50 m freestyle	25.70	68	did not advance			
Mark Thompson	Men's 50 m butterfly	28.90	43	did not advance			

Women

Athlete	Event	Heats		Semifinals		Final	
Athlete	Event	Time	Rank	Time	Rank	Time	Rank
Jade Howard	Women's 100 m freestyle	1:01.24	54	did not advance			
Jade Howard	Women's 50 m backstroke	32.91	50	did not advance			
