= Kwacha =

Kwacha may refer to:

- Malawian kwacha, the currency of Malawi since 1971
- Zambian kwacha, the currency of Zambia since 1968
- "Kwacha," a member of the UNITA political party in Angola
- Kwacha (constituency), a constituency of the National Assembly of Zambia
