= Zambia at the 2017 World Championships in Athletics =

- WA code: ZAM

in London
- Competitors: 2 in 2 events

World Championships in Athletics appearances
- 1987; 1991; 1993; 1995; 1997; 1999; 2001; 2003; 2005; 2007; 2009; 2011; 2013; 2015; 2017; 2019; 2022; 2023; 2025

Zambia competed at the 2017 World Championships in Athletics in London, United Kingdom, from 4–13 August 2017.

== Results ==
(q – qualified, NM – no mark, SB – season best)

=== Men ===
Track and road events

Athlete	Event	Heat		Semifinal		Final	
Athlete	Event	Result	Rank	Result	Rank	Result	Rank
Sydney Siame	200 metres	20.29 NR	9 Q	20.54	12	Did not advance	

=== Women ===
Track and road events

Athlete	Event	Heat		Semifinal		Final	
Athlete	Event	Result	Rank	Result	Rank	Result	Rank
Kabange Mupopo	400 metres	51.09	5 Q	50.60 SB	6 Q	51.15	7
