= Zambia at the 2022 World Aquatics Championships =

- Flag of Zambia
- FINA code: ZAM
- National federation: Zambia Amateur Swimming Union

in Budapest, Hungary 18 June 2022 – 3 July 2022
- Competitors: 2 in 1 sport
- Medals Ranked 0th: Gold 0 Silver 0 Bronze 0 Total 0

World Aquatics Championships appearances
- 1973; 1975; 1978; 1982; 1986; 1991; 1994; 1998; 2001; 2003; 2005; 2007; 2009; 2011; 2013; 2015; 2017; 2019; 2022; 2023; 2024

Zambia competed at the 2022 World Aquatics Championships in Budapest, Hungary from 18 June to 3 July.

== Athletes by discipline ==
The following is the list of number of competitors participating at the Championships per discipline.

Sport	Men	Women	Total
Artistic swimming	0	0	0
Diving	0	0	0
Open water swimming	0	0	0
Swimming	1	1	2
Water polo	0	0	0
Total	1	1	2

== Swimming ==
Athlete	Event	Heat		Semifinal		Final	
Athlete	Event	Time	Rank	Time	Rank	Time	Rank
Kumaren Naidu	Men's 50 m breaststroke	31.00	51	did not advance			
Kumaren Naidu	Men's 100 m breaststroke	1:11.40	59	did not advance			
Tilka Paljk	Women's 50 m breaststroke	33.64	40	did not advance			
Tilka Paljk	Women's 50 m butterfly	31.48	56	did not advance			
