= Zambia at the 2019 World Aquatics Championships =

- Flag of Zambia
- FINA code: ZAM
- National federation: Zambia Amateur Swimming Union

in Gwangju, South Korea
- Competitors: 3 in 1 sport
- Medals: Gold 0 Silver 0 Bronze 0 Total 0

World Aquatics Championships appearances
- 1973; 1975; 1978; 1982; 1986; 1991; 1994; 1998; 2001; 2003; 2005; 2007; 2009; 2011; 2013; 2015; 2017; 2019; 2022; 2023; 2024

Zambia competed at the 2019 World Aquatics Championships in Gwangju, South Korea from 12 to 28 July.

== Swimming ==
Zambia has entered three swimmers.

Men

Athlete	Event	Heat		Semifinal		Final	
Athlete	Event	Time	Rank	Time	Rank	Time	Rank
Ralph Goveia	50 m butterfly	25.08	54	did not advance			
Ralph Goveia	100 m butterfly	55.14	49	did not advance			
Kumaren Naidu	50 m breaststroke	DSQ		did not advance			
Kumaren Naidu	100 m breaststroke	1:10.13	83	did not advance			

Women

Athlete	Event	Heat		Semifinal		Final	
Athlete	Event	Time	Rank	Time	Rank	Time	Rank
Tilka Paljk	50 m breaststroke	32.37	34	did not advance			
Tilka Paljk	100 m breaststroke	1:15.02	42	did not advance			
