= Underprint =

Forgery prevention technique

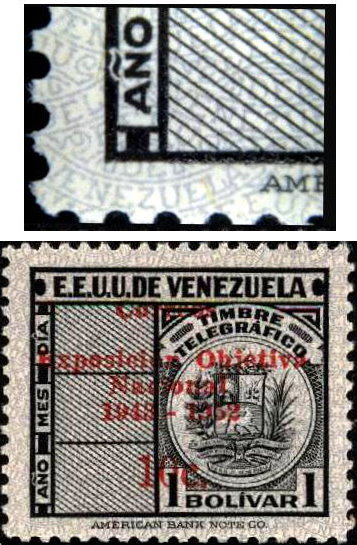
Underprinting on a Venezuela 1952 1b stamp

An underprint is anything printed underneath the main design of a stamp, banknote or similar item. Underprinting is used as a security measure to prevent forgery, or the cleaning of a postmark from a used stamp. The most common form of underprinting is burelage which takes the form of a faint pattern of lines or dots. Underprinting may also take the form of single or repeating words, for instance the word CUSTOMS at one time appeared underprinted on British revenue stamps.

== Printing on the back ==
The term has also been used in philately to refer to advertising or other wording printed on the back of postage stamps. However, this is thought to be an incorrect use of the term, with the word backprint being seen as more correct.

== Gallery ==
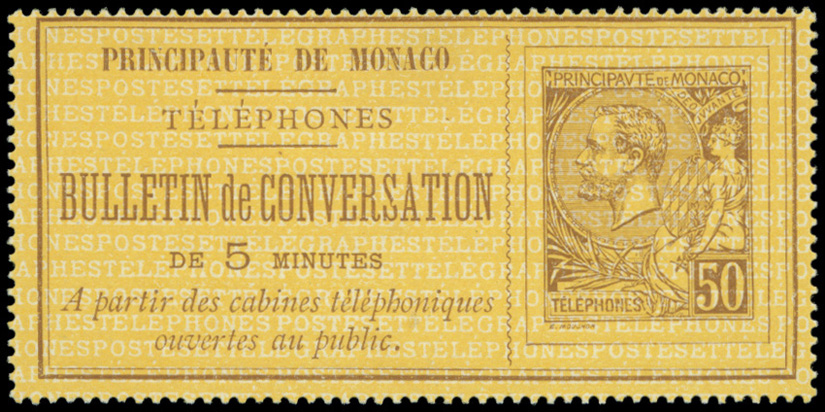
This telephone stamp of Monaco includes the underprinted repeating words POSTESETTTELEGRAPHSTELEPHONES.

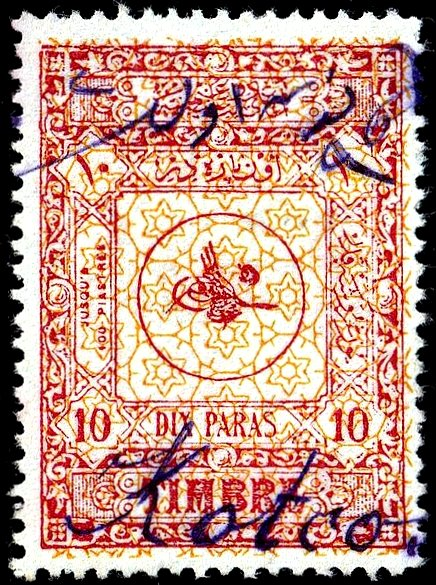
A yellow repeating burelage underprint may be seen on this 1912 revenue stamp of Turkey.

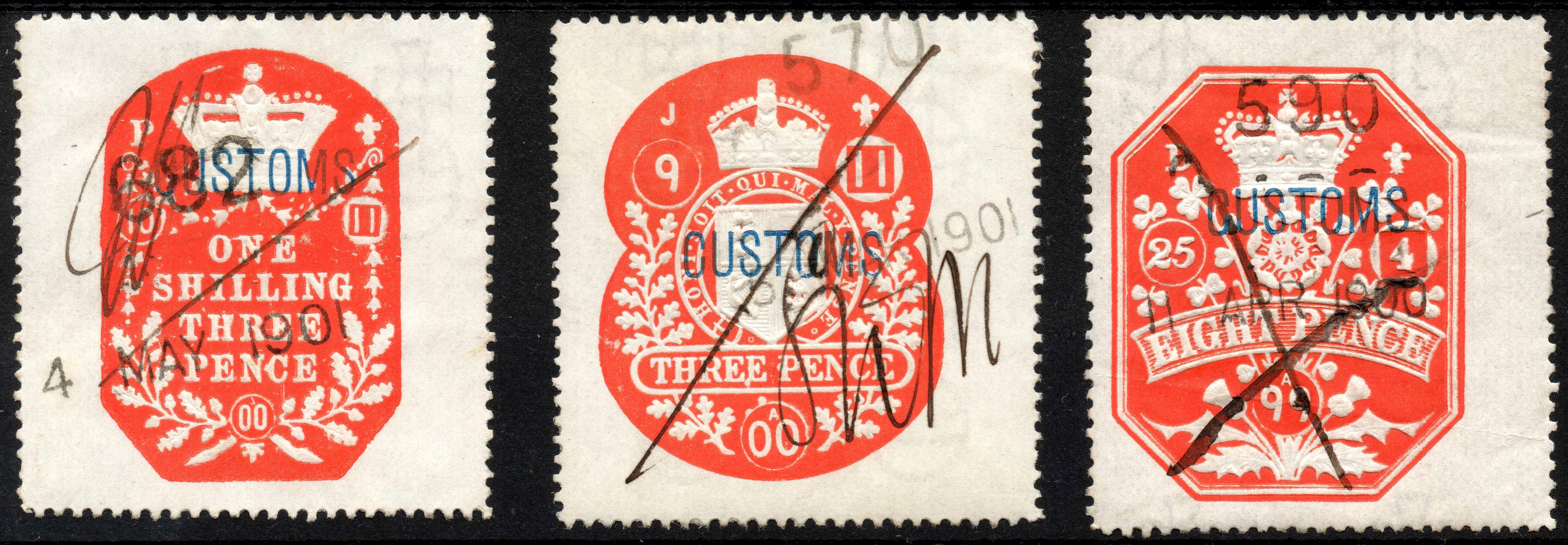
British embossed revenue stamps underprinted CUSTOMS

== See also ==
- Overprint
