= Freedom Statue =

Monument to freedom in Lusaka

The Freedom Statue is located in Lusaka, capital of Zambia. It represents the independence of Zambia and memorializes those who lost their lives in the movement to secure independence. The 12-foot statue was erected on the orders of Kenneth Kaunda in 1974 for the 10th anniversary of independence. It was made by British sculptor James Butler. The statue is depicted on the Zambian kwacha, and the center for celebration on Africa Day.

The statue is said to represent a scene in which freedom fighter Zanco Mpundu Mutembo broke the chains in which he was imprisoned in front of 18 soldiers, after being told to do so or be shot.
