= Zambia at the 2009 World Championships in Athletics =

- WA code: ZAM

in Berlin
- Competitors: 4
- Medals: Gold 0 Silver 0 Bronze 0 Total 0

World Championships in Athletics appearances
- 1987; 1991; 1993; 1995; 1997; 1999; 2001; 2003; 2005; 2007; 2009; 2011; 2013; 2015; 2017; 2019; 2022; 2023

Zambia competed at the 2009 World Championships in Athletics from 15–23 August in Berlin.

== Team selection ==
Event	Athletes	
Event	Men	Women
100 metres	Gerald Phiri	
200 metres	Gerald Phiri	
400 metres		Racheal Nachula
800 metres	Prince Mumba	
5000 metres	Tonny Wamulwa	

== Results ==
=== Men ===
Event	Athletes	Heats		Quarterfinals		Semifinal		Final	
Event	Athletes	Result	Rank	Result	Rank	Result	Rank	Result	Rank
100 m	Gerald Phiri	10.30	16 Q	10.16 NR	14 q	10.19	13	did not advance	
200 m	Gerald Phiri	did not start		did not advance					
800 m	Prince Mumba	1:48.13	33			did not advance			
5000 m	Tonny Wamulwa	14:01.67	32					did not advance	

=== Women ===
Event	Athletes	Heats		Semifinal		Final	
Event	Athletes	Result	Rank	Result	Rank	Result	Rank
400 m	Racheal Nachula	53.21	25			did not advance	
