= Zambia at the 2011 World Championships in Athletics =

- WA code: ZAM
- National federation: Zambia Amateur Athletic Association

in Daegu
- Competitors: 3
- Medals: Gold 0 Silver 0 Bronze 0 Total 0

World Championships in Athletics appearances
- 1987; 1991; 1993; 1995; 1997; 1999; 2001; 2003; 2005; 2007; 2009; 2011; 2013; 2015; 2017; 2019; 2022; 2023

Zambia competed at the 2011 World Championships in Athletics from August 27 to September 4 in Daegu, South Korea. A team of 3 athletes was announced to represent the country in the event.

== Results ==
=== Men ===
Athlete	Event	Preliminaries		Heats		Semifinals		Final	
Athlete	Event	Time Width Height	Rank	Time Width Height	Rank	Time Width Height	Rank	Time Width Height	Rank
Gerald Phiri	100 metres			10.60	40	Did not advance			
Prince Mumba	800 metres			1:46.73	17	1:47.06	20	Did not advance	

=== Women ===
Athlete	Event	Preliminaries		Heats		Semifinals		Final	
Athlete	Event	Time Width Height	Rank	Time Width Height	Rank	Time Width Height	Rank	Time Width Height	Rank
Racheal Nachula	400 metres			53.49 q, SB	24	53.30 SB	22	Did not advance	
