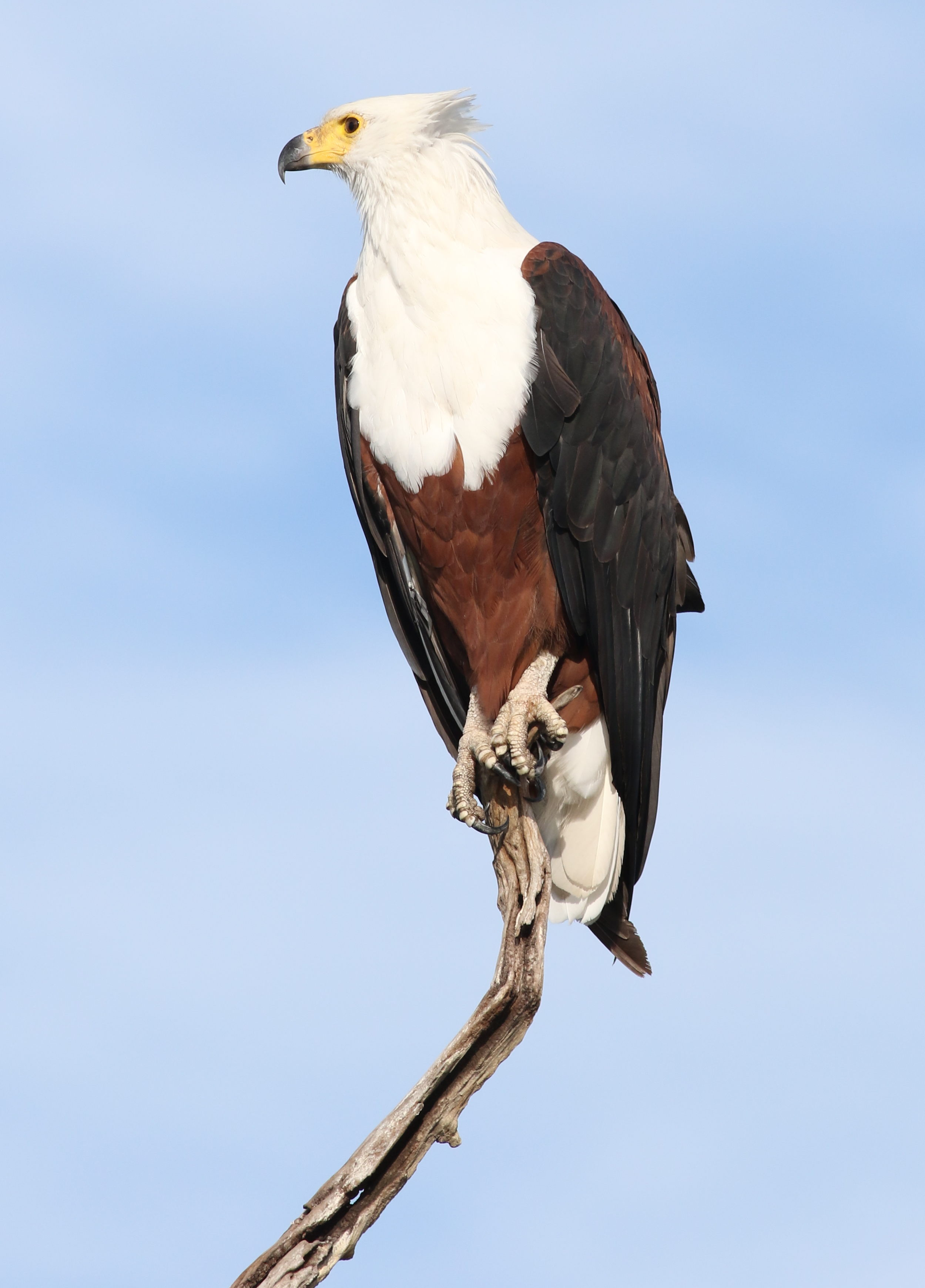
- At Chobe National Park, Botswana

Conservation status
- Least Concern (IUCN 3.1)
- CITES Appendix II

Scientific classification
- Kingdom: Animalia
- Phylum: Chordata
- Class: Aves
- Order: Accipitriformes
- Family: Accipitridae
- Genus: Icthyophaga
- Species: I. vocifer

Binomial name
- Icthyophaga vocifer (Daudin, 1800)
- resident area non-breeding area

Synonyms
- Haliaeetus vocifer

= African fish eagle =

Species of bird

The African fish eagle (Icthyophaga vocifer) or the African sea eagle is a large species of eagle found throughout sub-Saharan Africa wherever large bodies of open water with an abundant food supply occur. It is the national bird of Malawi, Namibia, Zambia, and Zimbabwe. As a result of its large range, it is known in many languages. Examples of names include: visarend in Afrikaans, nkwazi in Chewa, aigle pêcheur in French, idì in Yoruba, hungwe in Shona, inkwazi in isiZulu, and ntšhu in Northern Sotho. Though this species may superficially resemble the bald eagle in appearance they are not closely related and the two species occur on different continents, with the bald eagle being endemic to North America.

== Taxonomy ==
The African fish eagle is a species placed in the genus Icthyophaga (fish eagles). Its closest relative appears to be the critically endangered Madagascar fish eagle (I. vociferoides). Like all sea eagle species pairs, this one consists of a white-headed species (the African fish eagle) and a tan-headed one (Madagascar fish eagle). These are an ancient lineage of sea eagles; like other sea eagles, they have dark talons, beaks, and eyes. Both species have at least partially white tails even as juveniles. The vocifer is derived from its original genus name, so named by the French naturalist François Levaillant, who called it 'the vociferous one'.

== Description ==
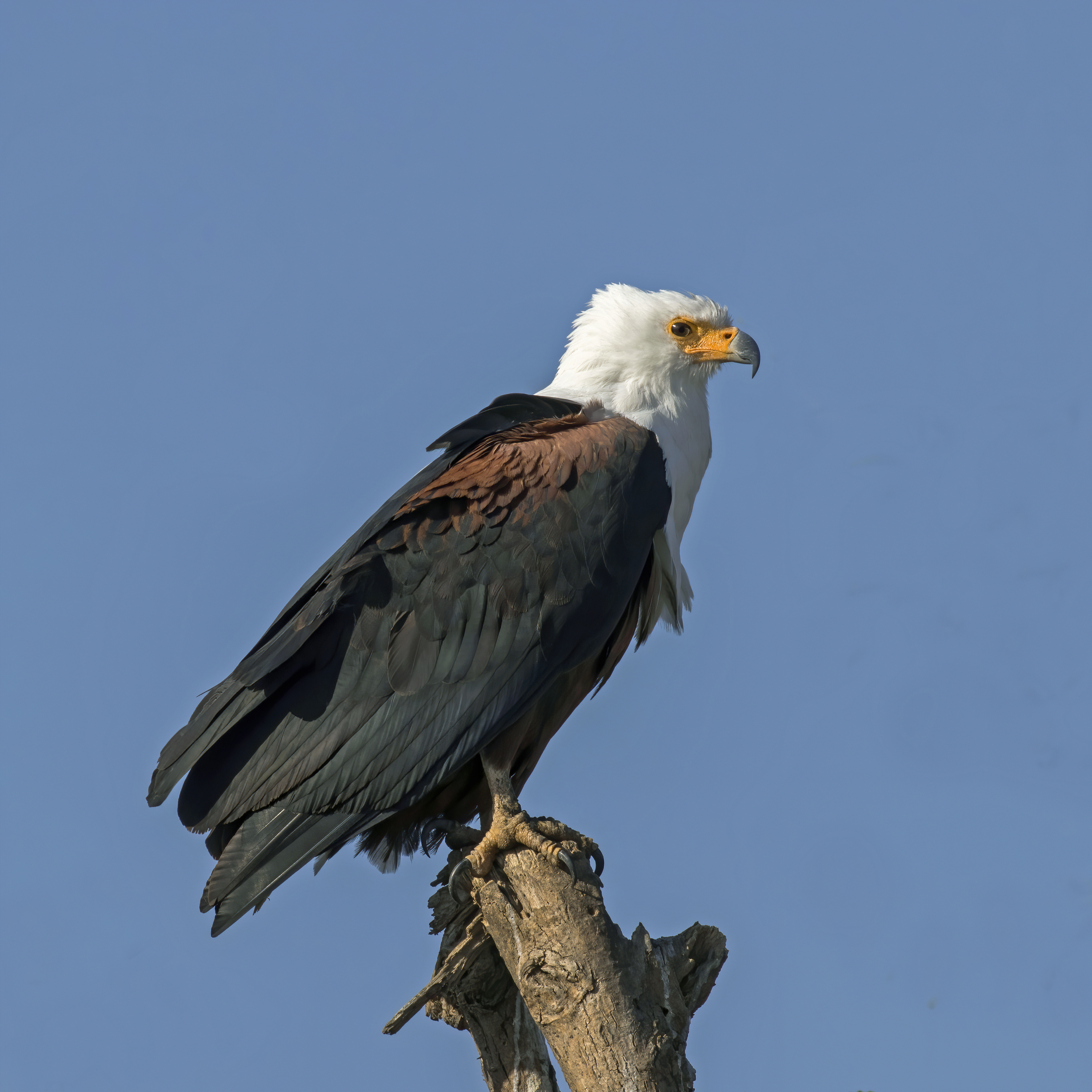
At Lake Zway, Ethiopia

The African fish eagle is a large bird. The female, at 3.2–3.6 kg (7.1–7.9 lb) is larger than the male, at 2.0–2.5 kg (4.4–5.5 lb). This is typical sexual dimorphism in birds of prey. Males usually have wingspans around 2.0 m (6.6 ft), while females have wingspans of 2.4 m (7.9 ft). The body length is 63–75 cm (25–29.5 in). The adult is very distinctive in appearance with a mostly brown body with a white head like the bald eagle and large, powerful, black wings. The head, breast, and tail of African fish eagles are snow white, except for the featherless face, which is yellow. The eyes are dark brown in colour. The hook-shaped beak, ideal for a carnivorous lifestyle, is yellow with a black tip. The plumage of the juvenile is brown, and the eyes are paler than the adult's. The feet have rough soles and are equipped with powerful talons to enable the eagle to grasp slippery aquatic prey. While this species mainly subsists on fish, it is opportunistic and may take a wider variety of prey, such as waterbirds. Its distinctive cry is, for many, evocative of the spirit or essence of Africa. The call, shriller when uttered by males, is a weee-ah, hyo-hyo or a heee-ah, heeah-heeah.

== Distribution and habitat ==
This species is still quite common near freshwater lakes, reservoirs, and rivers, although it can sometimes be found near the coast at the mouths of rivers or lagoons. African fish eagles are indigenous to sub-Saharan Africa, ranging over most of continental Africa south of the Sahara Desert. Several examples of places where they may be resident, include the Orange River in South Africa and Namibia, the Okavango Delta in Botswana, and Lake Malawi bordering Malawi, Tanzania, and Mozambique. The African fish eagle is thought to occur in substantial numbers around the locations of Lake Victoria and other large lakes in Central Africa, particularly the Rift Valley lakes. This is a generalist species, requiring only open water with sufficient prey and a good perch, as evidenced by the number of habitat types in which this species may be found, including grasslands, swamps, marshes, tropical rainforests, fynbos, and even desert-bordering coastlines, such as that of Namibia. The African fish eagle is absent from arid areas with little surface water.

== Reproduction ==
African fish eagles breed during the dry season, when water levels are low. They are believed to mate for life. Pairs often maintain two or more nests, which they frequently reuse. Because nests are reused and built upon over the years, they can grow quite large, some reaching 2.0 m (6.5 ft) across and 1.2 m (3.9 ft) deep. The nests are placed in a large tree and are built mostly of sticks and other pieces of wood.

The female lays one to three eggs, which are primarily white with a few reddish speckles. Incubation is mostly done by the female, but the male incubates when the female leaves to hunt. Incubation lasts for 42 to 45 days before the chicks hatch. Siblicide does not normally occur in this taxon, and the parents often successfully rear two or three chicks. Chicks fledge around 70 to 75 days old. Post-fledgling dependence lasts up to three months, whereafter the juveniles become nomadic and may congregate in groups away from territorial adults. Those that survive their first year have a life expectancy of some 12 to 24 years.

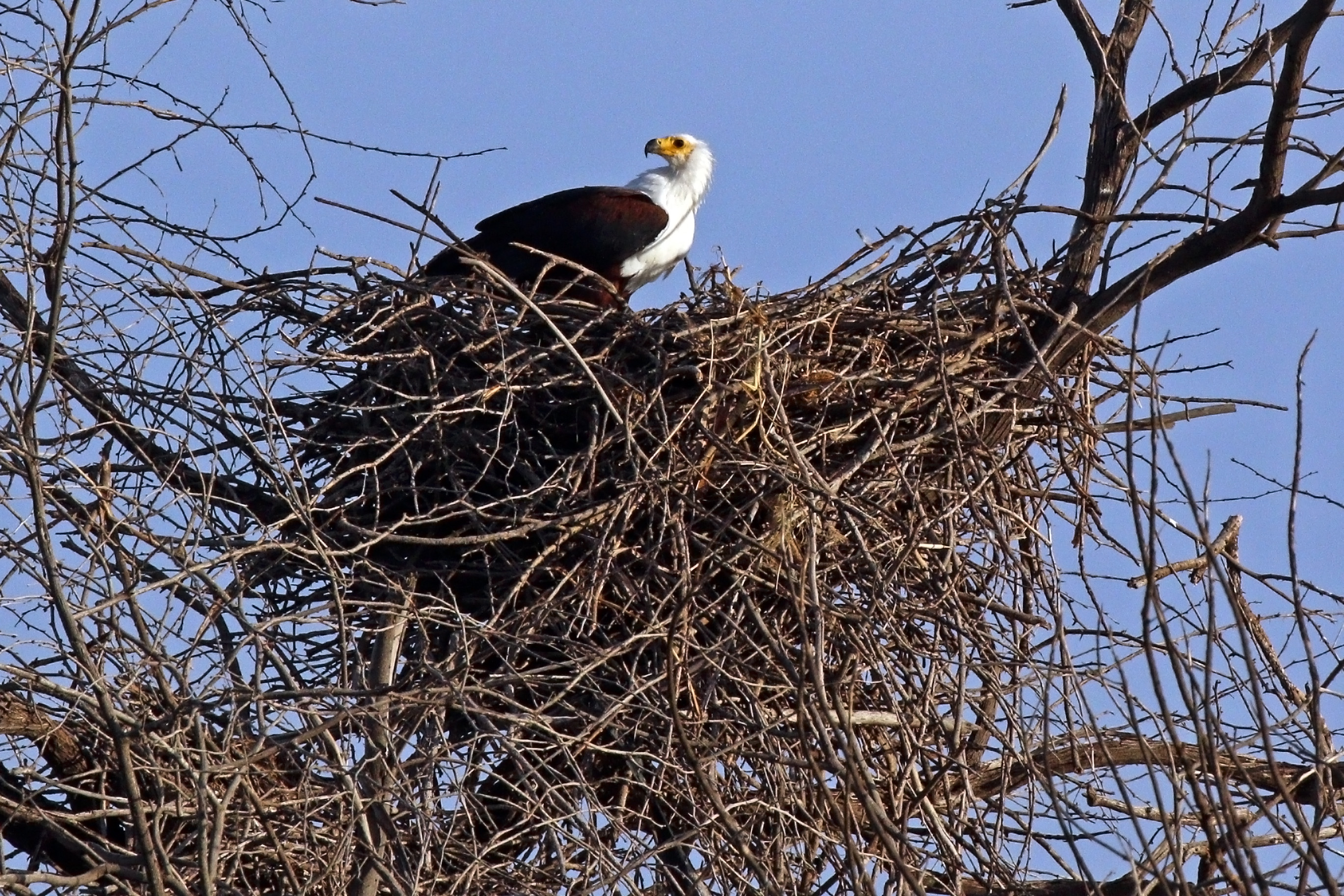
An adult on the nest at Lake Baringo, Kenya

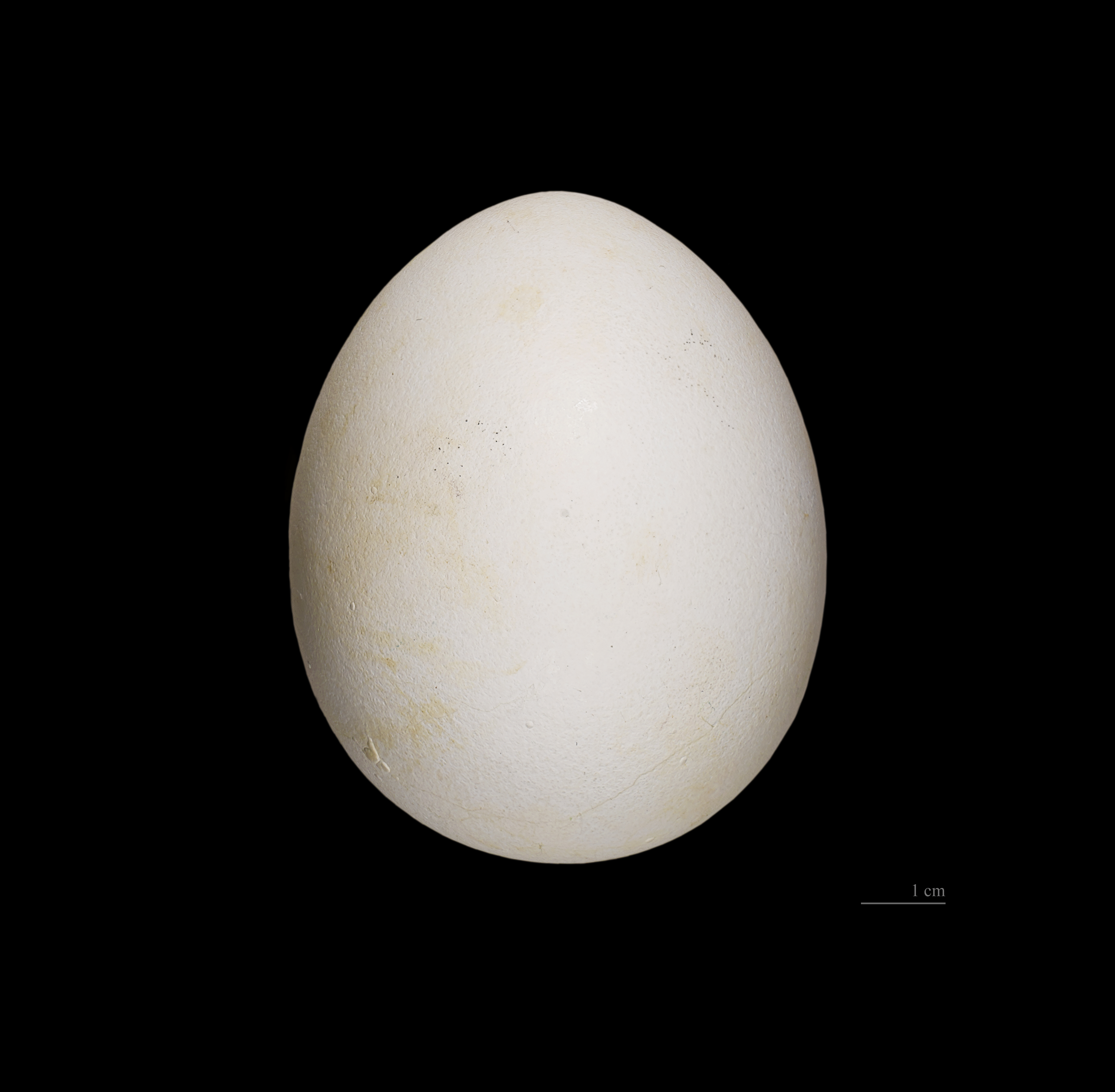
Egg

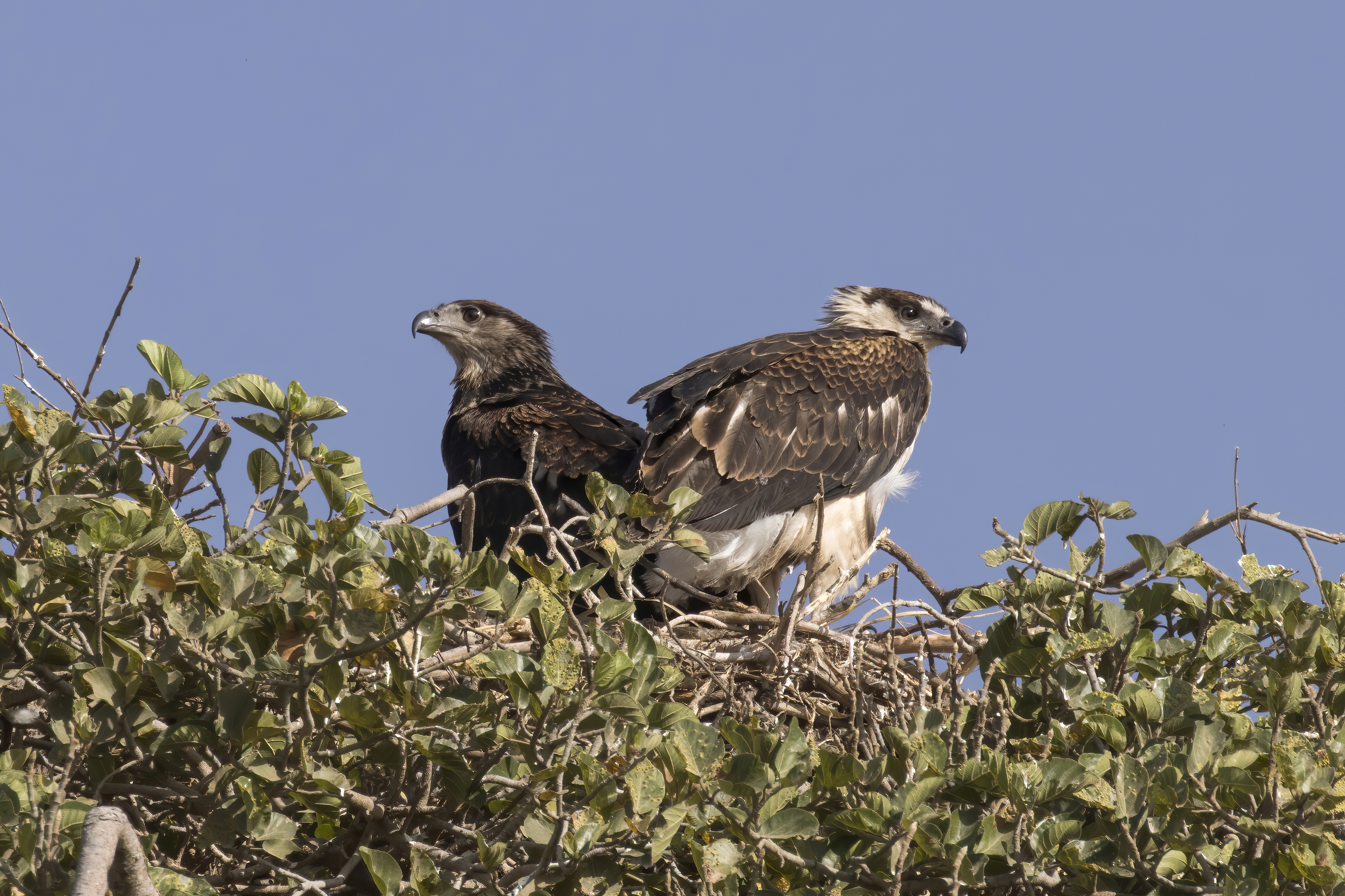
Juveniles in nest, Ethiopia

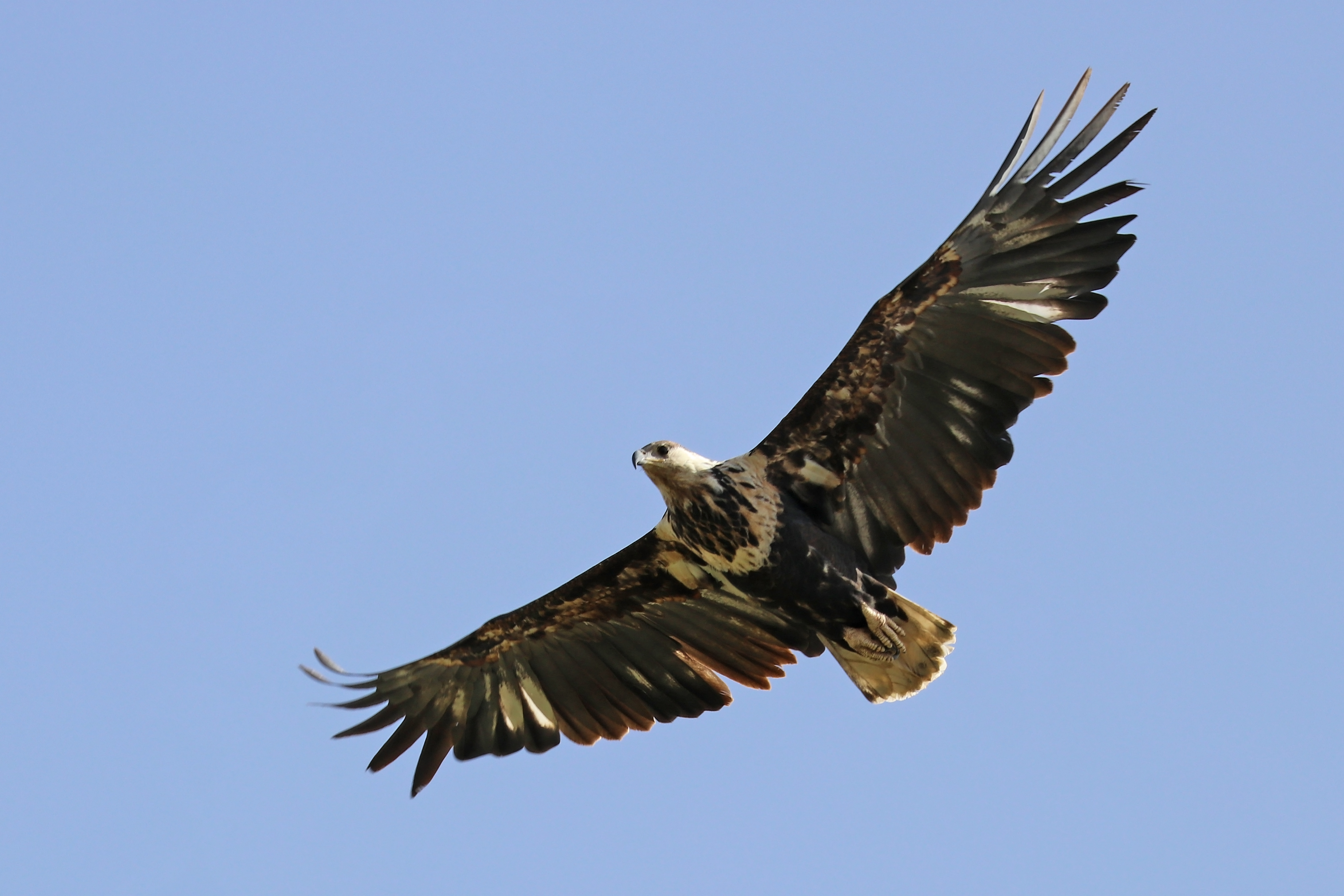
Juvenile in flight, Ethiopia

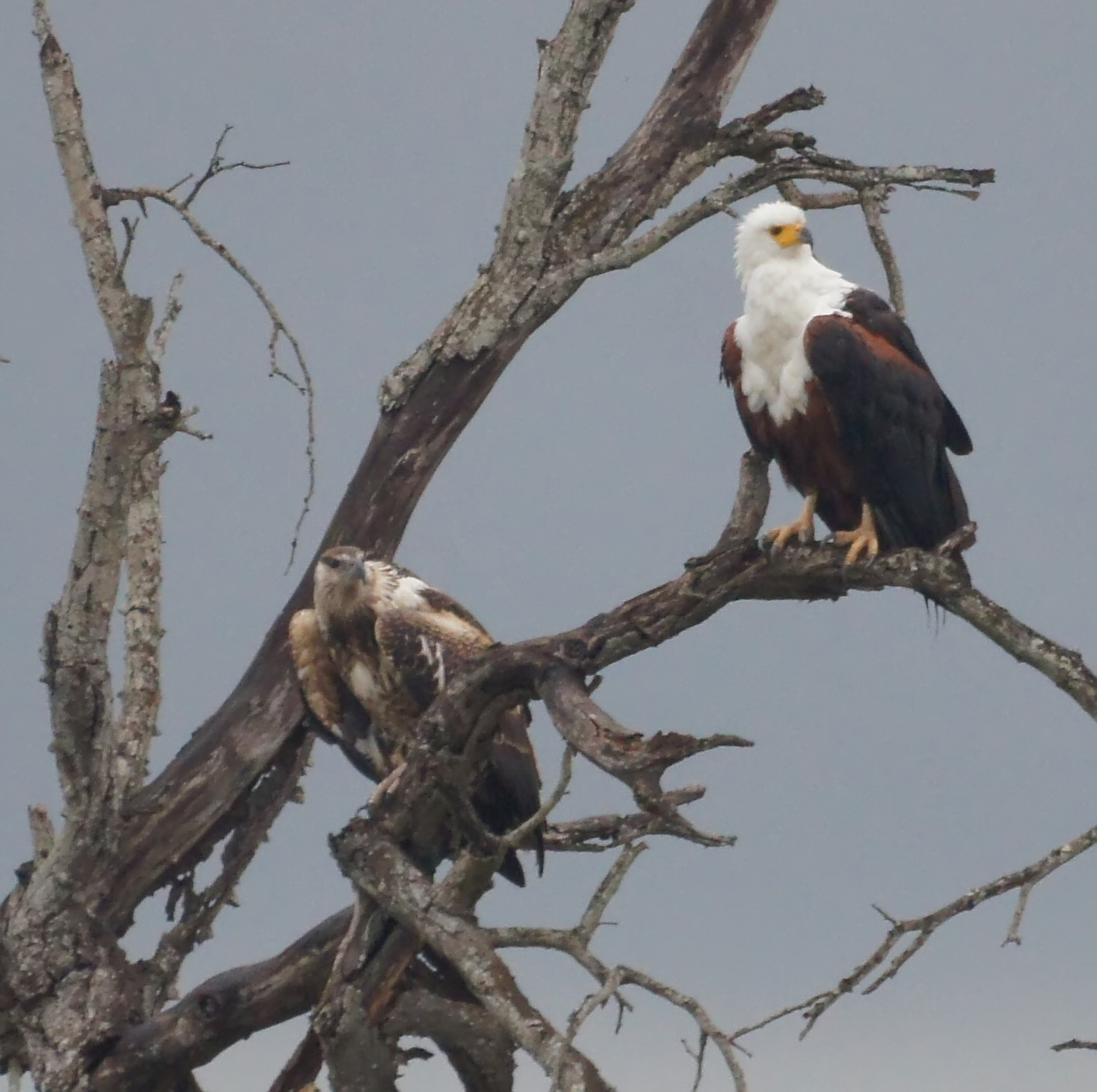
Adult with juvenile

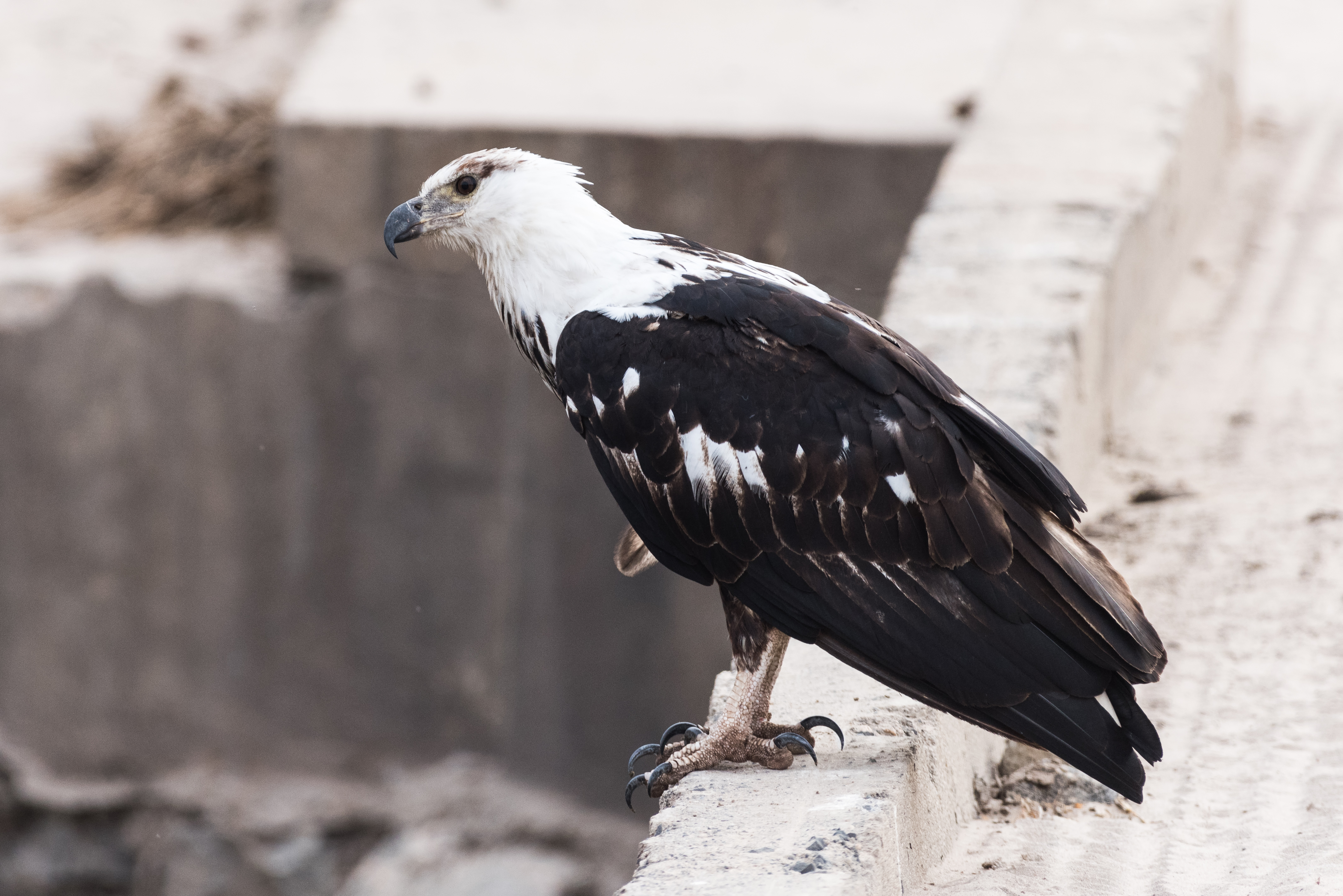
Juvenile

== Diet ==
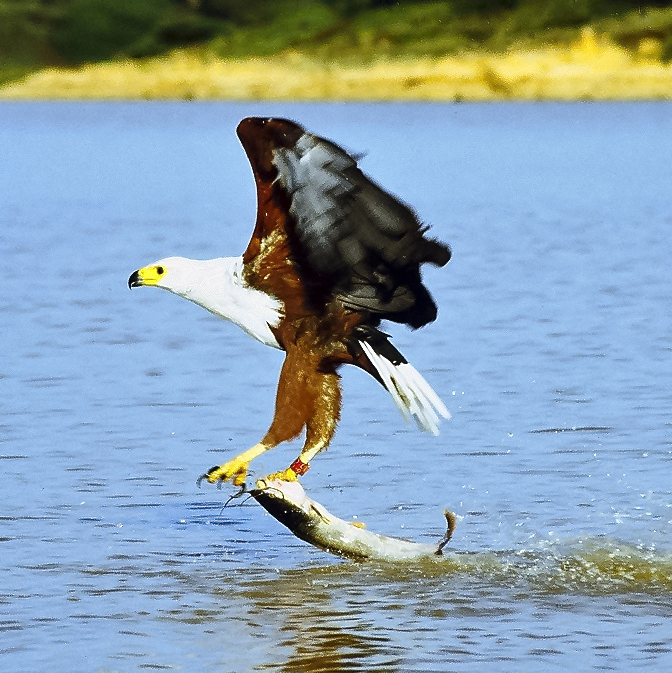
African fish eagle carrying off a catfish in Lake Baringo, Kenya

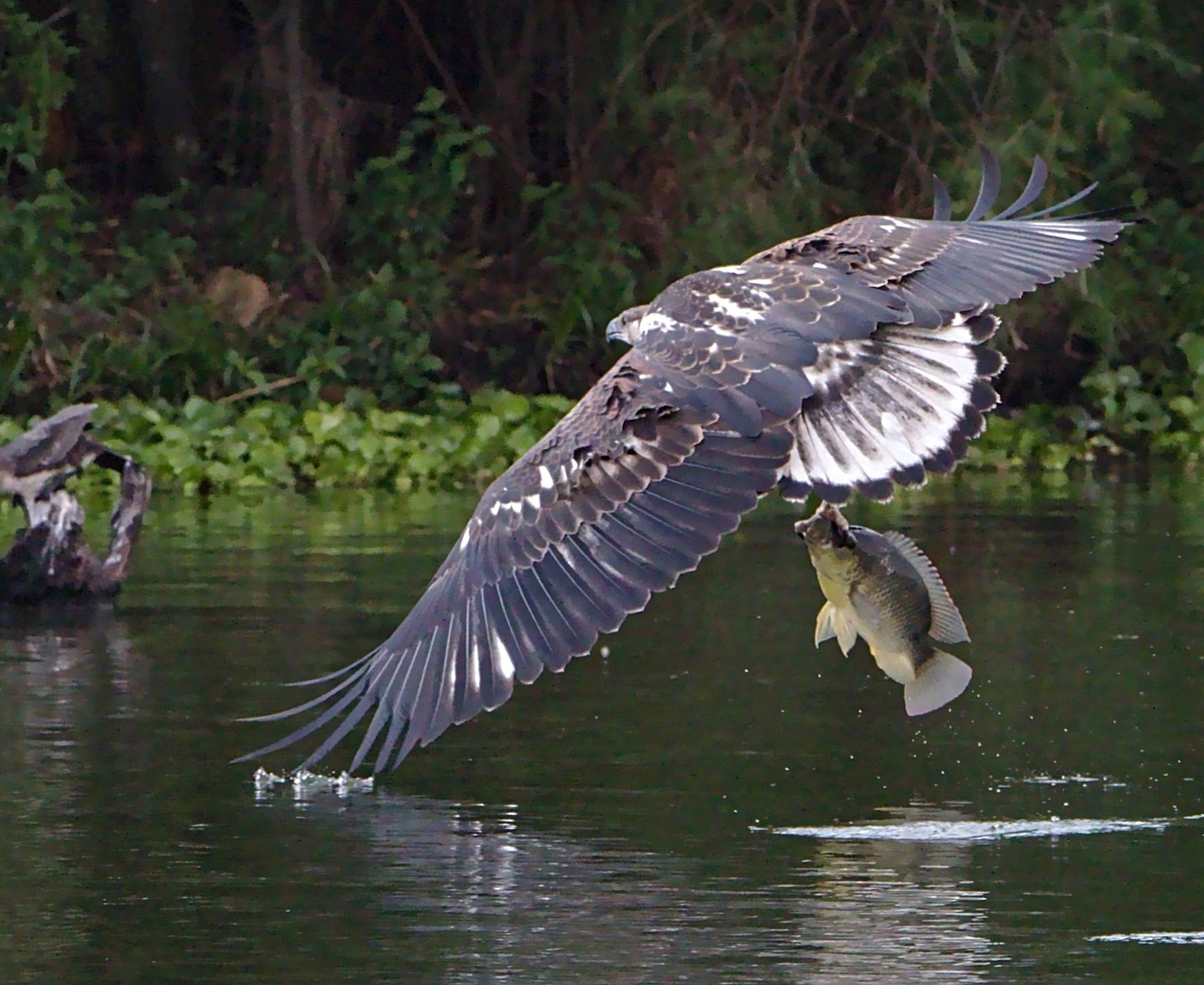
A juvenile catching a tilapia near Pretoria

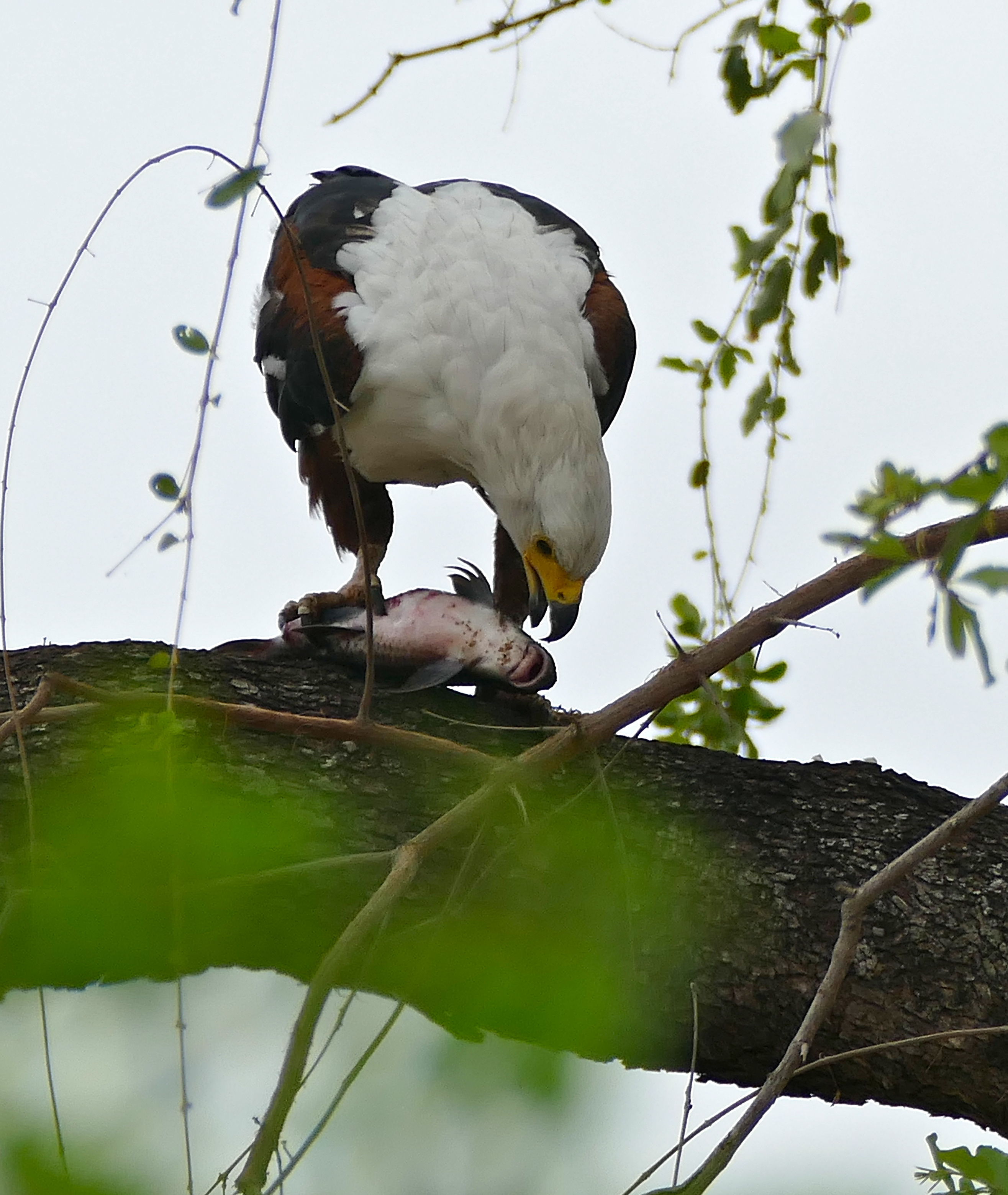
Eating fish, likely a mudfish, in Kruger National Park

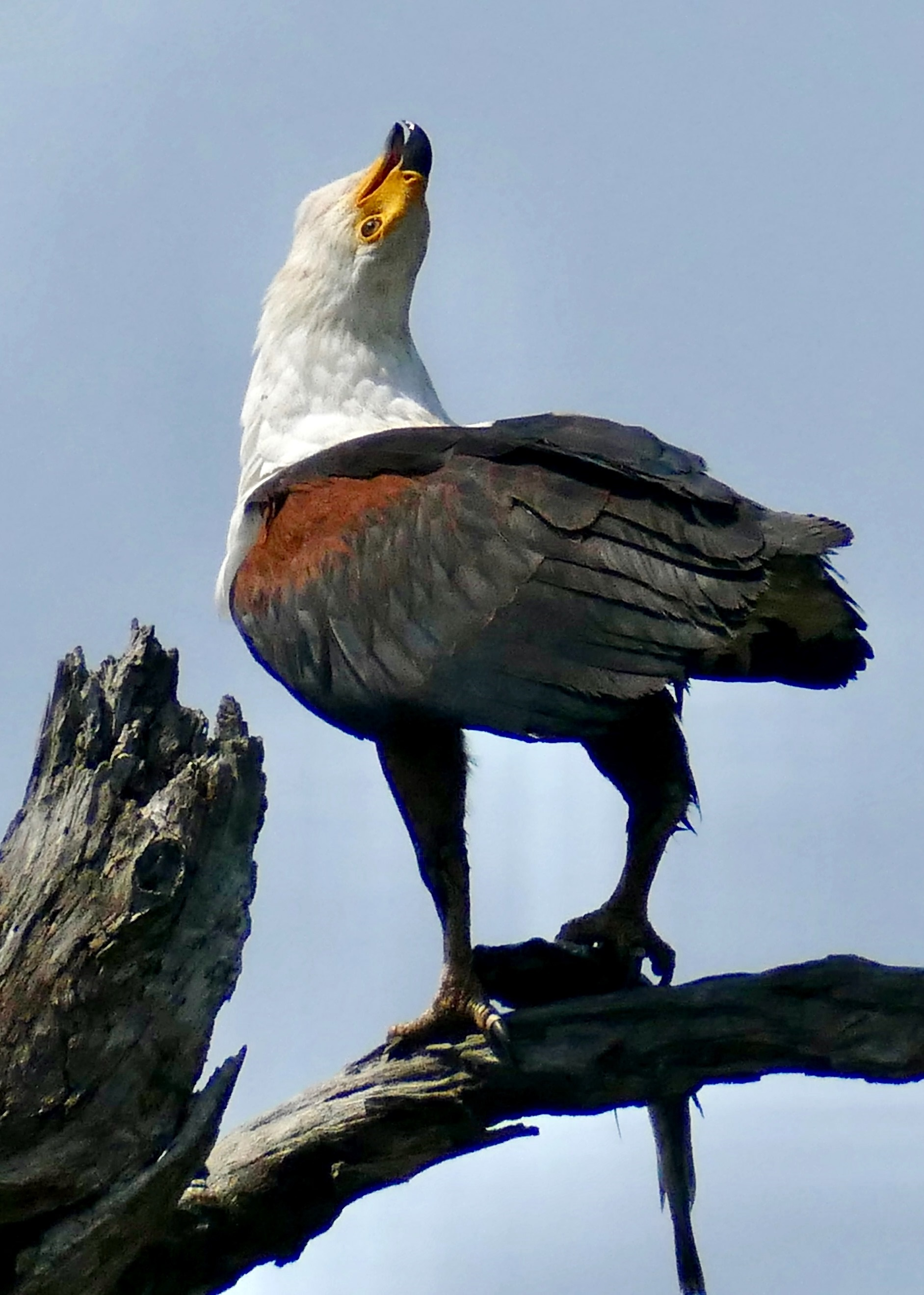
Calling after catching a tilapia, Kruger Nat. Park

The African fish eagle feeds mainly on fish, which it swoops down upon from a perch in a tree, snatching the prey from the water with its large, clawed talons. The eagle then flies back to its perch to eat its catch. Like other sea eagles, the African fish eagle has structures on its toes called spiricules that allow it to grasp fish and other slippery prey. The osprey, a winter visitor to Africa, also has this adaptation. African fish eagles usually catch fish around 200 to 1,000 g (0.44 to 2.20 lb), but fish up to 4,200 g (9.3 lb) can be taken. If it catches a fish too heavy to allow the eagle to sustain flight, it will drop into the water and paddle to the nearest shore with its wings. Mullets and catfish (Clarias) are common prey, though various fish such as cichlids, tilapias (Oreochromis), lungfish (Protopterus), characins, and eels can be also taken. Even African tigerfish (Hydrocynus vittatus) can be preyed upon by fish eagles, especially while predating barn swallows (Hirundo rustica) in flight.

It also feeds on birds, especially waterbirds such as ducks, coots, cormorants, grebes, darters, hatchlings of herons and egrets, storks, ibises, spoonbills, cormorants, whiskered terns, and ducks, and both adult and hatchling greater and lesser flamingos. Other prey include doves, small turtles and terrapins, baby crocodiles, Nile monitors, skinks, frogs (bullfrogs), insects (especially termites), and carrion. Occasionally, it may even take mammalian prey, such as hyrax, monkeys, rats, hares, and dik-diks. It has also been observed feeding on domestic fowl (chickens). The African fish eagle is known to steal the catch of other bird species, a practice known as kleptoparasitism. Targeted species are usually large wading birds such as goliath herons, hammerkops, marabou storks, and shoebills, as well as kingfishers, pelicans, ospreys, and other fish eagles, which usually hunt large fish and take a long time to handle them.

== Relationship with humans ==
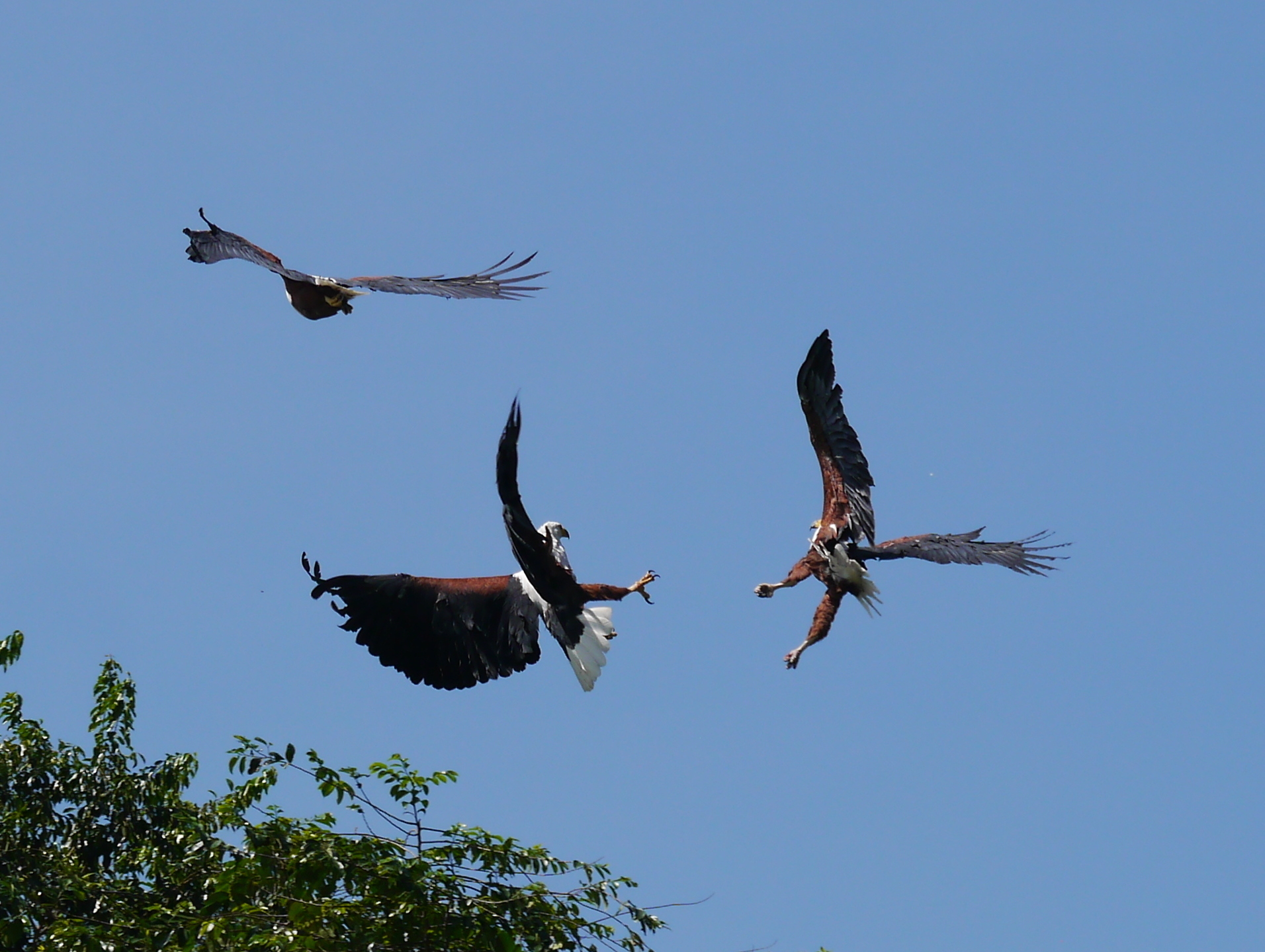
Three eagles, in Uganda

=== Conservation ===
This species is listed as least concern by the IUCN. The estimated population size is about 300,000 individuals with a distribution area of 18,300,000 km^{2}.

=== Heraldry ===
In the form of the Zimbabwe Bird, it is the national bird of Zimbabwe and appears on the Zimbabwean flag. The bird also figures in the coats of arms of Malawi, Namibia, Zambia, and South Sudan, and on the Zambian flag.

== Mummies ==
Mummified examples of the African fish eagle have been found at the Necropolis at Elkab.

== Gallery ==
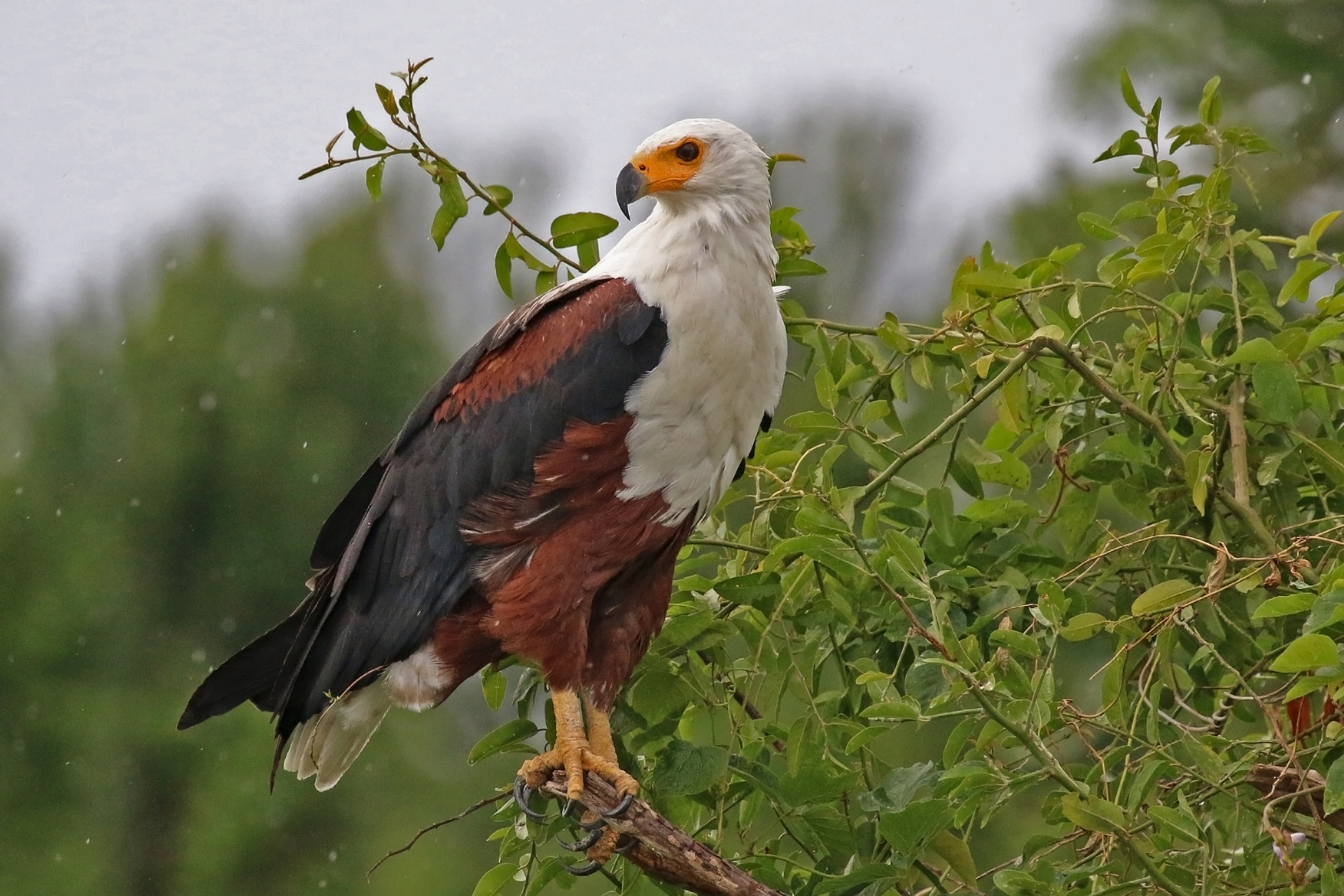
Kazinga Channel, Uganda

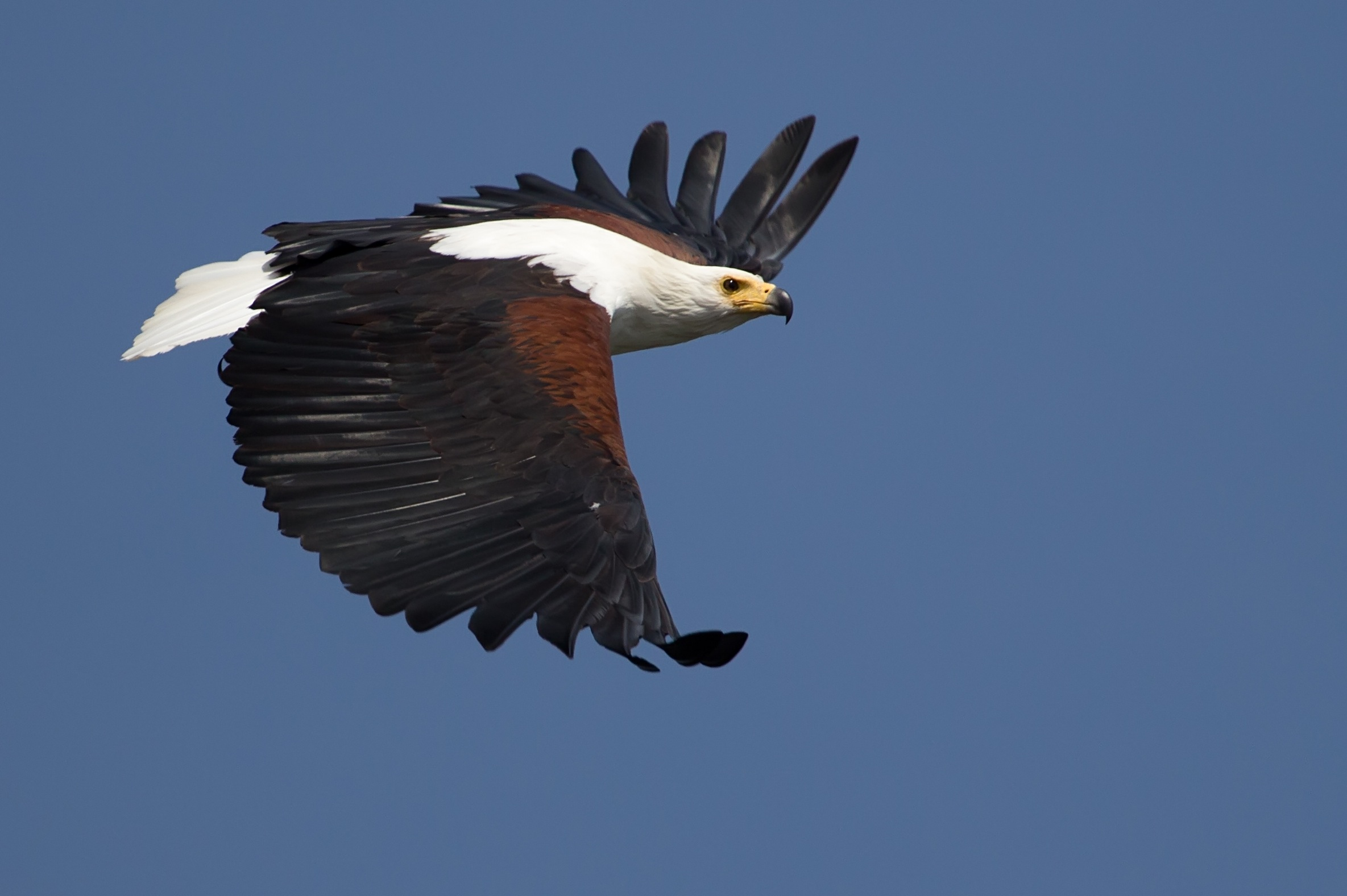
Lake Naivasha, Kenya

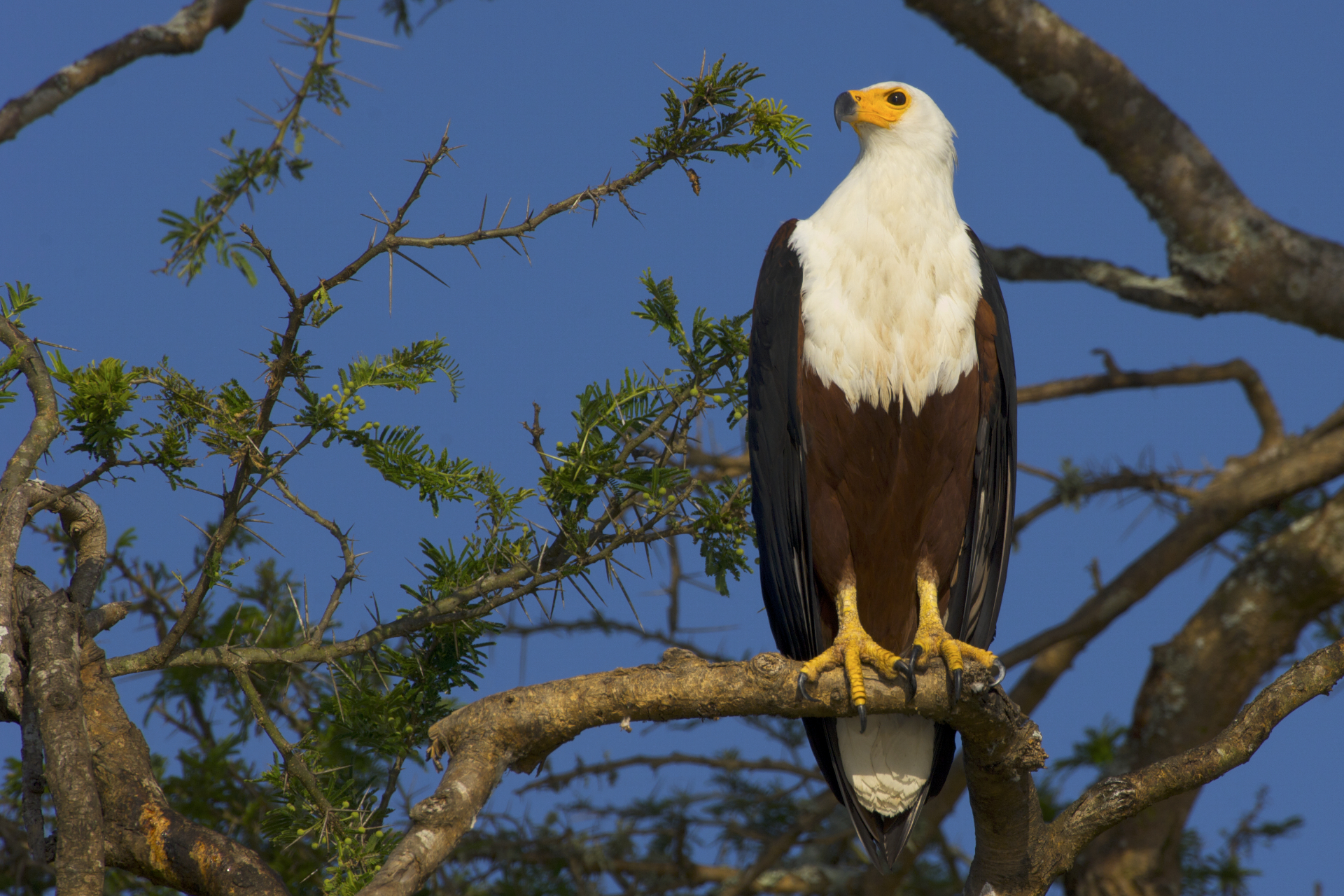
Lake Mburo, Uganda
