= Damien Shamambo =

Zambian swimmer (born 2003)

Personal information
- Born: August 19, 2003 (age 22)

Sport
- Sport: Swimming

Damien Shamambo (born 19 August 2003) is a Zambian swimmer. He competed in the men's 50 metre freestyle event at the 2024 Summer Olympics, but did not advance past the heats.
