= Coat of arms of Zambia =

- Armiger: Republic of Zambia
- Adopted: 24 October 1964
- Crest: An eagle Or displayed above a crossed hoe and pickaxe proper
- Shield: Sable six pallets wavy Argent
- Supporters: Sinister: Zambian man in bush khaki shirt and shorts; dexter: Zambian woman in traditional dress
- Compartment: Green earth with a mine shaft, a maize cob and a zebra all proper.
- Motto: One Zambia, One Nation
- Earlier version(s): Northern Rhodesia
- Use: 1939-1964

The coat of arms of Zambia was adopted on 24 October 1964 when the Republic of Zambia reached its independence. This coat of arms is adapted from the arms of the British protectorate of Northern Rhodesia which dated to 1927, with the wavy black and white vertical lines as the field and the eagle (then holding a fish) in the chief.

The African fish eagle represents the conquest of freedom and nation's hope for the future. The hoe and pickaxe represent the country's economic backbone: agriculture and mining, as well as the characteristics that have influenced Zambia's evolution and nature. The shield is a representation of Victoria Falls with white water cascading over black rock. The Victoria Falls represents the Zambezi river, from which Zambia takes its name. The coat of arms also has emblems of Zambia's natural resources: minerals and mining, agriculture and wildlife. The shield is supported by two figures which represent the common man and woman of the nation. The country's motto is "One Zambia, One Nation" which emphasises the need for unity in a country of over 72 ethnic groups.

== See also ==
- Coat of arms of the Federation of Rhodesia and Nyasaland (1954–1963)
