= Flag of Zambia =

Republic of Zambia
- Use: National flag and ensign
- Proportion: 2:3
- Adopted: 24 October 1964; 62 years ago (modified in 1996)
- Design: A green field with an orange coloured eagle in flight over a rectangular block of three vertical stripes coloured from left to right in red, black, and orange
- Designed by: Gabriel Ellison

The arms of Northern Rhodesia, featuring the eagle, date to 1927.

The national flag of Zambia was adopted upon independence on 24 October 1964, by the first Republican president, Dr. Kenneth David Kaunda. Before that, Zambia was the British protectorate of Northern Rhodesia and used a Blue Ensign as its flag.

The current flag is used as both national flag and ensign. It is green with an orange-coloured African fish eagle in flight over a rectangular block of three vertical stripes, coloured, from left to right: red, black, and orange. The placement of the eagle and block of stripes at the flag's fly is notable as most emblems and devices on flags are placed at centre or at the hoist. Green stands for the nation's agriculture and lush flora, red for the nation's struggle for freedom, black for the Zambian people and all black Africans, and orange for the land's copper, natural resources in general, and mineral wealth. Additionally, the eagle flying above the coloured stripes is intended to represent freedom and the people's ability to rise above the nation's issues.

The Zambian flag was slightly modified in 1996. The shade of green used in the 1964 flag was replaced with brighter and lighter green and the eagle was slightly altered so as to be more like the one used in the Zambian coat of arms.

== Design ==
The design of the national flag of Zambia is described in National Flag and Armorial Ensigns Act of 4 June 1965.

Green with an orange coloured eagle in flight over a rectangular block of three vertical stripes coloured from left to right in red, black and orange; of overall dimensions 3:2; and to the following colour specifications:

- "Spectrum Green", British Colour Council Shade reference 100
- "Union Jack Red", British Colour Council Shade reference 210
- "Jet Black", British Colour Council Shade reference 220
- "Spectrum Orange", British Colour Council Shade reference 57
Construction sheet of the Zambian flag

=== Colours ===
The colours' approximation in other colour spaces are listed below:

Colour scheme	Green	Red	Black	Orange/Eagle
RGB	20, 127, 85	212, 8, 41	0, 0, 0	249, 152, 21
Hexadecimal	#147F55	#D40829	#000000	#F99815
CMYK	84, 0, 33, 50	0, 86, 93, 13	0, 0, 0, 100	0, 39, 92, 2

The dark green was adjusted in 1996 to a lighter and brighter green. In 2012 the London Organising Committee of the Olympic and Paralympic Games solicited advice from each participating nation in specifying the correct Pantone colours for its flag. Once confirmed, the results were published in a guide. The colours given were:

	Green	Red	Black	Orange
Pantone	PMS 355	PMS 032	PMS Black	PMS 150

The flag of Zambia according to the correct Pantone colours.

=== Symbolism ===
The flag's colours and emblems are rich in symbolism. Each of the four colours represents an aspect of Zambia: green for the country's natural resources and vegetation; red for its struggle for freedom; black for its people and orange for its mineral wealth (primarily copper). The eagle is an African fish eagle, which also appears in the national coat of arms and represents the people's ability to rise above the nation's problems.

== Flag protocol ==
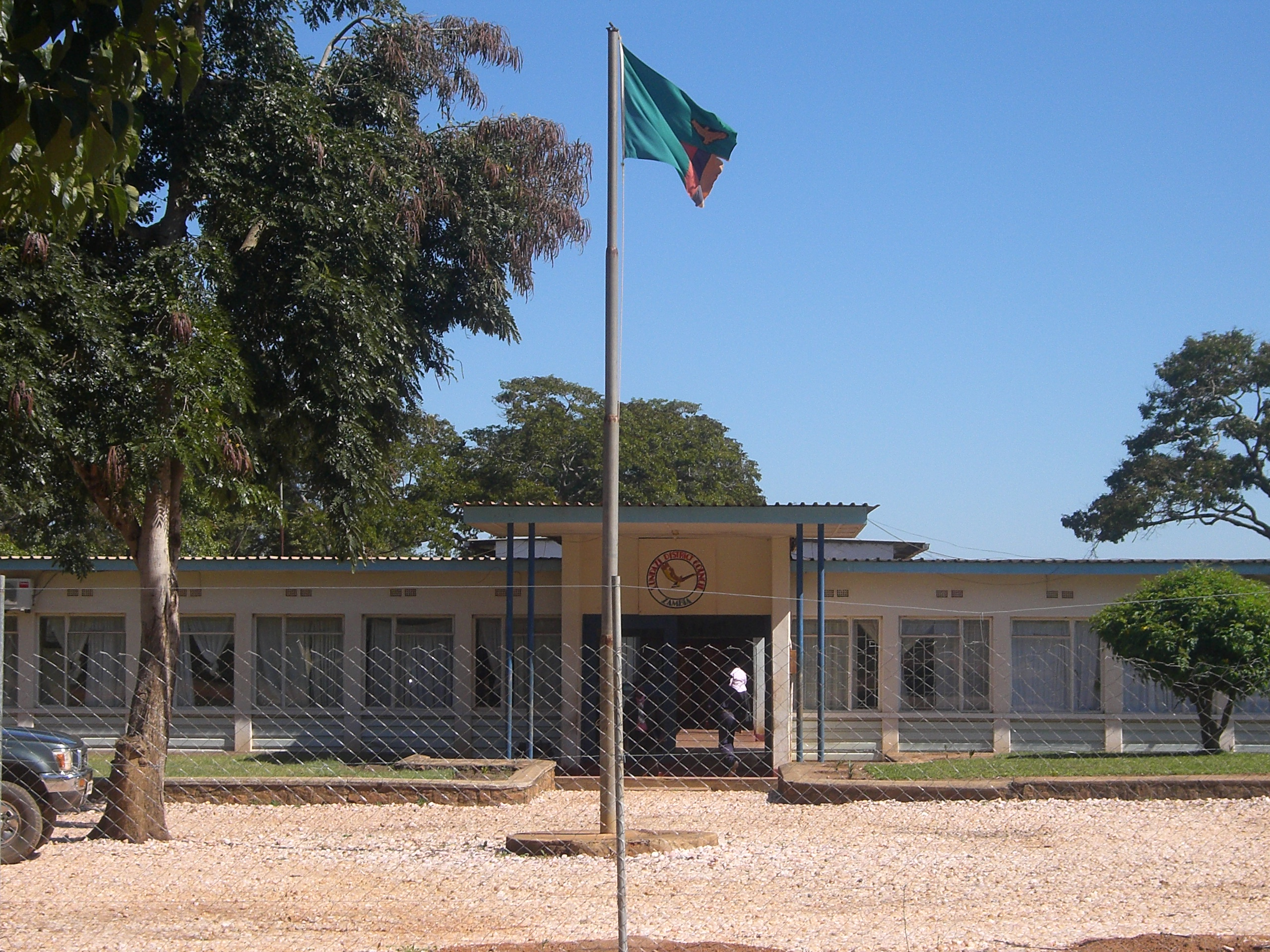
The flag flying outside the Lundazi Council building

By law, the Zambian flag should be flown only between the hours of sunrise and sunset and may be flown:

- at buildings or premises owned or occupied by the Government;
- at buildings or premises owned or occupied by local government authorities;
- at buildings or premises owned or occupied by any statutory board or statutory corporation;
- at state-aided schools;
- on any motor car, boat or ship in or by which a Minister of Government is for the time being travelling;
- on any ship registered as Zambian.

The flag is not allowed to be flown by any other individual or institution without express written permission from the Minister except on the following occasions:

- on the following public holidays, namely: Africa Freedom Day, Heroes Day, Unity Day, and Independence Day;
- on such other days or occasions as the Minister may declare for this purpose.

== Historical flags ==
Flag	Date	Use	Description
	1864–1891	Flag of the Kingdom of Barotseland	A red field with a white diagonal stripe.
	1864–1891	Royal flag of Barotseland	A red field with a white disc and a black elephant inside the disc.
	1891–1924	Flag of the British South Africa Company	A Union Jack defaced with the emblem of the British South Africa Company in the centre.
	1924–1964	Flag of the United Kingdom	A superimposition of the flags of England and Scotland with the Saint Patrick's Saltire (representing Ireland).
	1939–1964	Flag of Northern Rhodesia (NR is sometimes known as British Congo)	A Blue Ensign with the emblem of Northern Rhodesia.
	1939–1964	Flag of the Governor of Northern Rhodesia	A Union Jack defaced with the emblem of Northern Rhodesia in the centre.
	1953–1964	Flag of the Federation of Rhodesia and Nyasaland	A blue ensign with the emblem of the federation.
	1953–1963	Flag of the governor-general of the Federation of Rhodesia and Nyasaland	A dark blue flag bearing the royal crest (a lion standing on the Crown), beneath which was the name of the Federation.
	1953–1963	Royal Rhodesia Air Force ensign	Azure blue ensign with the Union Flag in the canton and the roundel of the Royal Rhodesian Air Force in the fly.
	1963–1964	Royal Rhodesia Air Force ensign	Azure blue flag with the Union Flag in the canton and the roundel of the Royal Rhodesian Air Force in the fly.
	1964–1996	Flag of Zambia	A dark green field with an orange coloured eagle in flight over a rectangular block of three vertical stripes coloured from left to right in red, black, and orange.

== Other flags ==
=== Presidential flags ===
Flag	Date	Use	Description
	1964–present	Presidential Flag of Zambia	An orange field with the national coat of arms in the centre.

=== Municipality flags ===
Flag	Date	Use	Description
	1936–present	Flag of Kitwe	A horizontal bicolour of brown with three signs of Venus, and blue with seven wavy white vertical stripes and an eagle.

=== Military flags ===
Flag	Date	Use	Description
	1964–present	Flag of the Zambia Police Service	A blue field with the national flag in the canton and the emblem of the police in the lower fly.
	1964–present	Flag of the Zambian Air Force	A light blue field with the Zambia Air Force roundel in the centre.
	1964–present	Zambian Civil Air ensign	A light blue field with the Zambia civil air roundel in the centre.

== See also ==
- Coat of arms of Zambia
